= One Million Checkboxes =

2024 video game

- Gameplay in the Safari web browser on an iPhone
- Developer: Nolen Royalty
- Platform: Browser
- Release: June 26, 2024; 2 years ago
- Genre: Incremental game
- Modes: Single-player; Multiplayer (formerly)

One Million Checkboxes is a free web-based incremental game developed and released by American software engineer and video game developer Nolen Royalty in June 2024. The game consists of a web page containing one million checkboxes, which visitors can check or uncheck. Upon release, all visitors saw the same state of the checkboxes, leading them to interact with each other by selecting and deselecting the same boxes. According to Royalty, the website took him two days to develop.

Although Royalty expected the site to receive no more than a few hundred visitors, the game received thousands of participants and involved more than 650 million check and uncheck actions before it was shut down two weeks after it began. Methods such as Internet bots, scripting languages, and hacking were used to rapidly alter checkboxes.

The game received an overall positive reception. Multiple publications described the game as addictive and praised its simple premise, while others criticized the usage of bots on the website. In 2025, Royalty released One Million Chessboards, a website containing one million chessboards, as a successor to One Million Checkboxes.

== Gameplay ==
One Million Checkboxes was a website that contained one million checkboxes. Users were able to check or uncheck the boxes by clicking or tapping them. Every player saw the same state of checkboxes and could watch as boxes they checked or unchecked changed from the interactions of other players. Some of the boxes had different-colored outlines, which served no particular purpose. The web page displayed both the overall number of checked boxes on the website and the number of boxes the player had checked.

Fifteen days after the game's release, the developer added a "sunsetting" feature that locked checkboxes if they were not unchecked quickly. The game was shut down after two weeks of uptime, with 650 million check and uncheck actions having been taken, though users are still able to play on their own.

== Development and release ==
One Million Checkboxes was created by Nolen Royalty (eieio), a 32-year-old American software engineer and video game developer based in Brooklyn. Royalty had previously developed other games, including ones about staring contests, a bouncing DVD-Video logo, converting blinks into Morse code, and playing rock paper scissors with a stranger. Royalty developed One Million Checkboxes in two days after a conversation with a friend, inspired by frivolous websites from the early days of the Internet. He bought the domain name for $10 and initially made the site in Python, a general-purpose programming language.

Royalty first shared the game on the Twitter on June 26, 2024, and it went viral on the platform and other social networking services, including Mastodon, Reddit, and Hacker News. Due to the game's rapid uptake, Royalty had to quickly and repeatedly add server capacity while dealing with multiple website crashes. According to Royalty's blog, he and a friend rewrote the back end in Go, a high-level programming language, to better handle the large amount of activity on the site.

== Activity ==
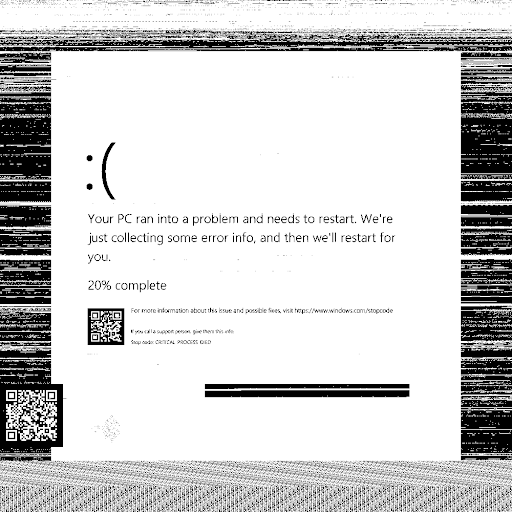
An example of art encoded by Internet bot writers: a grid showing a Microsoft Windows blue screen of death

As thousands of players participated, patterns in behavior emerged. The first box was checked most often, followed by the boxes with colored outlines. Some players prioritized checking as many boxes as they could, while others behaved competitively to uncheck the most boxes. Players also used the checkboxes to write messages or create artwork, often using Internet bots that could check and uncheck boxes at high speed. The game's developer, Nolen Royalty, discovered that teenagers were leaving secret messages for each other through sequences of boxes via binary ASCII representation and collaborating on elaborate ways to hack the game, such as by rapidly updating boxes to encode moving GIFs of actor Jake Gyllenhaal. For a brief period of time, Royalty removed a feature that imposed a rate limit on the frequency of boxes being checked, and users implemented a Rickroll animation of singer Rick Astley.

== Reception ==
In July 2024, Royalty estimated that 400,000 unique people had visited One Million Checkboxes. Writing for The Washington Post, Shira Ovide called the game "fantastic" and referred to it as "the most pointless website on the planet", comparing the simple pleasure it provided to that of popping bubble wrap. Writing for The New York Times, Callie Holtermann stated that the game had become a case study in Internet behavior and represented a "microcosm of the joys and horrors of digital life".

Writers from TechRadar, USA Today, and India's The Telegraph agreed that the game was addictive. Although The Telegraph's Mathures Paul stated that playing the game was "pointless", he complimented the site's "beautiful retro feel" and noted that some players would appreciate competing against other humans rather than artificial intelligence or chatbots. Writing for TheGamer, Tessa Kaur noted that One Million Checkboxes had been compared to r/place, a recurring online social experiment hosted on Reddit. However, Kaur expressed concern about the encouraged use of bots and scripts, arguing that it "ruins the fun" and brought concerns of bot activity on human interaction.

In December 2024, The Washington Post gave One Million Checkboxes an honorable mention in its list of "5 actually good things" in technology that year, stating that the game "showed how technology can be silly fun and bring out the best in us". That same month, The New York Times included the game in "The Delight" section of its recap of brief viral moments in 2024.

Also in 2024, the game received a Multiplayer Award in the Tiny Awards 2024 competition, created to recognize "the best of the small, poetic, creative, handmade web". The jurors highlighted its value as "an experiment in collective online psychology and community".

== Legacy ==
In 2025, Royalty released One Million Chessboards as a successor to One Million Checkboxes, featuring a 1,000×1,000 grid of chessboards. Moving a chess piece simultaneously moves it for every other player, there are no turns, and players can move between boards. Royalty estimated that in the 10 days after the game's launch, more than 150,000 players participated, making more than 15 million moves.

== See also ==
- Poietic Generator, a collaborative social network game
- The Button (Reddit), an online metagame and social experiment hosted on Reddit in 2015
- The Million Dollar Homepage, a website with the goal of selling one million pixels
- Wplace, a collaborative pixel art website based on r/place
- 2024 in video games
