= Wordle =

2021 browser game

- Developer: Josh Wardle
- Publishers: Josh Wardle (2021–2022); The New York Times Games (since 2022)
- Platforms: Browser, Mobile app
- Release: October 2021
- Genre: Word game
- Mode: Single-player

Wordle is a web-based word game created and developed by Welsh software engineer Josh Wardle. In the game, players have six attempts to guess a five-letter word, receiving feedback through coloured tiles that indicate correct letters and their placement. A single puzzle is released daily, with all players attempting to solve the same word. It was inspired by the game Mastermind.

Originally developed as a personal project for Wardle and his partner, Wordle was publicly released in October 2021. It gained widespread popularity in late 2021 after the introduction of a shareable emoji-based results format, which led to viral discussion on social media. The game's success spurred the creation of numerous clones, adaptations in other languages, and variations with unique twists. It has been well-received, being played 4.8 billion times during 2023.

The New York Times Company acquired Wordle in January 2022 for a "low seven-figure sum". The game remained free but underwent changes, including the removal of offensive or politically sensitive words and the introduction of account logins to track stats. Wordle was later added to the New York Times Crossword app (later The New York Times Games) and accompanied by WordleBot, which gave players analysis on their gameplay. In November 2022, Tracy Bennett became the game's first editor, refining word selection. Also in 2022, Hasbro released a physical board game based on Wordle, and in May 2026, NBC announced it was bringing Wordle as a prime time game show sometime in 2027, hosted by Savannah Guthrie.

== Gameplay ==
Wordle #196 solved in 4 guesses

Each day, a new five-letter word is chosen, and players attempt to guess it within six tries. After each guess, the letters are colour-coded based on their accuracy:

- Green indicates a correct letter in the correct spot.
- Yellow signifies that the letter is in the word but in the wrong spot.
- Grey means the word does not contain that letter in any spot.

If a guessed word contains multiple instances of the same letter—such as the "o"s in "robot"—those letters will be marked green or yellow only if the answer also contains them multiple times. If not, extra occurrences will be marked grey.

Each day's answer is drawn from a curated list of 2,309 words. Wordle now follows American spelling conventions, and it has a "hard mode" option, which requires players to use any revealed green or yellow letters in subsequent guesses. The daily word is the same for all players worldwide. Additionally, the game offers both a dark theme and a high-contrast mode for colourblind accessibility, replacing the standard green and yellow colour scheme with orange and blue.

Conceptually and stylistically, the game is similar to the 1955 pen-and-paper game Jotto and the game show franchise Lingo. The gameplay is also similar to the two-player Word Mastermind variety of the board game Mastermind —and the game "Bulls and cows", with the exception that Wordle confirms the specific letters that are correct. According to data collected by The New York Times, the most common first guesses are "adieu", "audio", "stare", "raise", and "arise". However, it was found that starting words such as "adieu" and "audio" may put players at a disadvantage, taking more attempts to solve than starting words such as "slate", "crane", and "trace". Computer algorithms can consistently solve the puzzle within five of the six allowed guesses.

== History ==
=== Early development ===
In 2013, Josh Wardle created an early prototype of Wordle, initially calling it Mr. Bugs' Wordy Nugz. Inspired by the colour-matching mechanics of the board game Mastermind, the prototype allowed players to solve puzzles consecutively. Originally, the game included all (approximately 13,000) five-letter words in the English language, but Wardle found that his partner, Palak Shah, struggled with many obscure words; this made guessing feel as random as it did in Mastermind. To improve the experience, he had Shah filter the list, reducing it to about 2,000 more familiar words—enough to last roughly five years at one puzzle per day. She categorized words into those she knew, those she didn't, and those she might have known. By 2014, Wardle had completed the prototype but eventually lost interest and set it aside.

In the years that followed, Wardle created the online social experiments The Button and Place while working for Reddit. When the COVID-19 pandemic struck, he and his partner "got really into" The New York Times's Spelling Bee and daily crossword puzzle. This reignited his interest in Wordle, and he drew inspiration from Spelling Bee's minimalist web design and its one-puzzle-per-day format. By January 2021, Wardle had published Wordle on the web, shared only with himself and his partner. He named it Wordle as a pun on his surname.

=== Rise in popularity ===
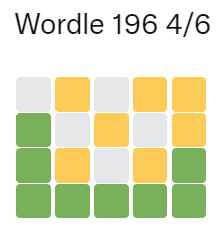
The emoji grid copied by sharing the result from the above Wordle game. In text form: Wordle 196 4/6 ⬜️🟨⬜️🟨🟨 🟩⬜️🟨⬜️🟨 🟩🟨⬜️🟨🟩 🟩🟩🟩🟩🟩

Later he shared it with his relatives, where it "rapidly became an obsession" for them. Over the next few months, he introduced the game to close friends, and by mid-October 2021, it began spreading virally. At one point, Wardle discovered that a group of friends in New Zealand had developed an emoji-style display for sharing their results. Inspired by this, he incorporated the feature into the game. After adding the sharing function, Wordle became a viral phenomenon on Twitter in late December 2021.

Subsequently, the game's player base rose greatly: from 90 players on November 1, 2021, to over 300,000 by January 2, 2022, and more than 2 million a week later. Between January 1 and 13, 1.2 million Wordle results were shared on Twitter. Several media outlets, including CNET and The Indian Express, attributed the game's popularity to its daily puzzle format. Wardle suggested that having one puzzle per day creates a sense of scarcity, leaving players wanting more; he said it encourages players to spend only three minutes on the game each day. He also noted some subtler details about the game, such as the game's keyboard changing to reflect the game state, as reasons for players' enjoyment. Despite its viral success, Wardle stated he had no plans to monetize the game, emphasizing, "It's not trying to do anything shady with your data or your eyeballs ... It's just a game that's fun." In an interview on BBC Radio 4's Today, Wardle stated that he does not know each day's word so he can still enjoy playing the game himself.

Separately, a completely unrelated game called Wordle! by Steven Cravotta—released on the App Store five years before Wardle's Wordle—experienced a surge in downloads due to name confusion. Between January 5 and 12, 2022, Cravotta's game was downloaded over 200,000 times. Recognizing that many users mistakenly believed it to be Wardle's game, Cravotta partnered with Wardle to donate $50,000 in proceeds to Boost, a tutoring charity for Oakland schoolchildren. Google Search also created an Easter egg when one searches for "Wordle", with the site's logo becoming an animated game of Wordle to find the word "Google". To prevent spoilers, Twitter blocked an auto-reply bot that had been posting the next day's answer in response to players' results.

=== Acquisition by the New York Times Company ===
On January 31, 2022, the New York Times Company, the parent company of the New York Times, acquired Wordle from Wardle for an "undisclosed price in the low-seven figures". Wardle explained that the overwhelming attention he and his partner had received in the preceding months made them uncomfortable. He was also reluctant to spend time combating the many Wordle clones that had emerged. "It felt really complicated to me, really unpleasant", he said, adding that selling the game allowed him to "walk away from all of that". Jonathan Knight, head of the New York Times games department, first reached out to Wardle on January 5, 2022, just two days after Wordle was featured in a New York Times article. The acquisition was finalized by the end of the month, with chief product officer Alex Hardiman stating, "I don't think I've ever seen us move on an acquisition this fast." Vanity Fair reported that the New York Times narrowly outbid The Washington Post to acquire the game.

The New York Times planned to integrate Wordle into its digital puzzle offerings, alongside its crossword and Spelling Bee, as part of its goal to reach 10 million digital subscribers by 2025. The company assured players that the game would initially remain free and that no changes would be made to its core gameplay. However, fans worried that Wordle would eventually be placed behind a paywall. Due to these concerns, some players downloaded the webpage to preserve offline access, as Wordle operates entirely through client-side JavaScript. On February 10, Wordle officially moved to The New York Times website, with player statistics carried over. However, some users reported that their daily streaks had reset after the transition. To integrate the game into the New York Times online platform, developers rebuilt it using React and introduced New York Times account login support as another way to track progress.

As part of the transition, the New York Times removed certain words from Wordle's answer list that were deemed insensitive or offensive, including "slave" and "lynch", to make the game "accessible to more people". Additionally, they eliminated some British spelling variants, such as "fibre". The New York Times also made real-time changes in response to current events, ensuring Wordle remained separate from the news. In May 2022, the word "fetus" was removed from the solution list following the leaked Supreme Court draft opinion on Dobbs v. Jackson Women's Health Organization. By July 2022, a total of seven words had been removed from the original 2,315 Wordle answers, causing the New York Times version to become unsynchronized with older, cached versions of the game. This discrepancy made it difficult for players using different versions to compare scores.

On August 24, 2022, Wordle was added to The New York Times Crossword app, with progress synced across mobile and desktop versions, and on April 7, 2022, WordleBot was launched by the New York Times to give players information about how they completed their Wordle on that day, giving a luck and skill rating. According to the New York Times quarterly earnings report ending on March 31, 2022, the acquisition of Wordle brought "tens of millions" of new players to the New York Times puzzle site and app, many of whom continued to play the other puzzles offered by the New York Times. Editors in the New York Times games department called the following months the "Hot Wordle Summer" due to further increases in players on their games app resulting from Wordle.

In collaboration with the New York Times, Hasbro developed Wordle: The Party Game, a physical board game adaptation of the online game. Designed for two to four players, the game has one participant select a secret word each round, which the others attempt to guess following Wordle's standard rules. The game was released in October 2022.

==== Editor ====
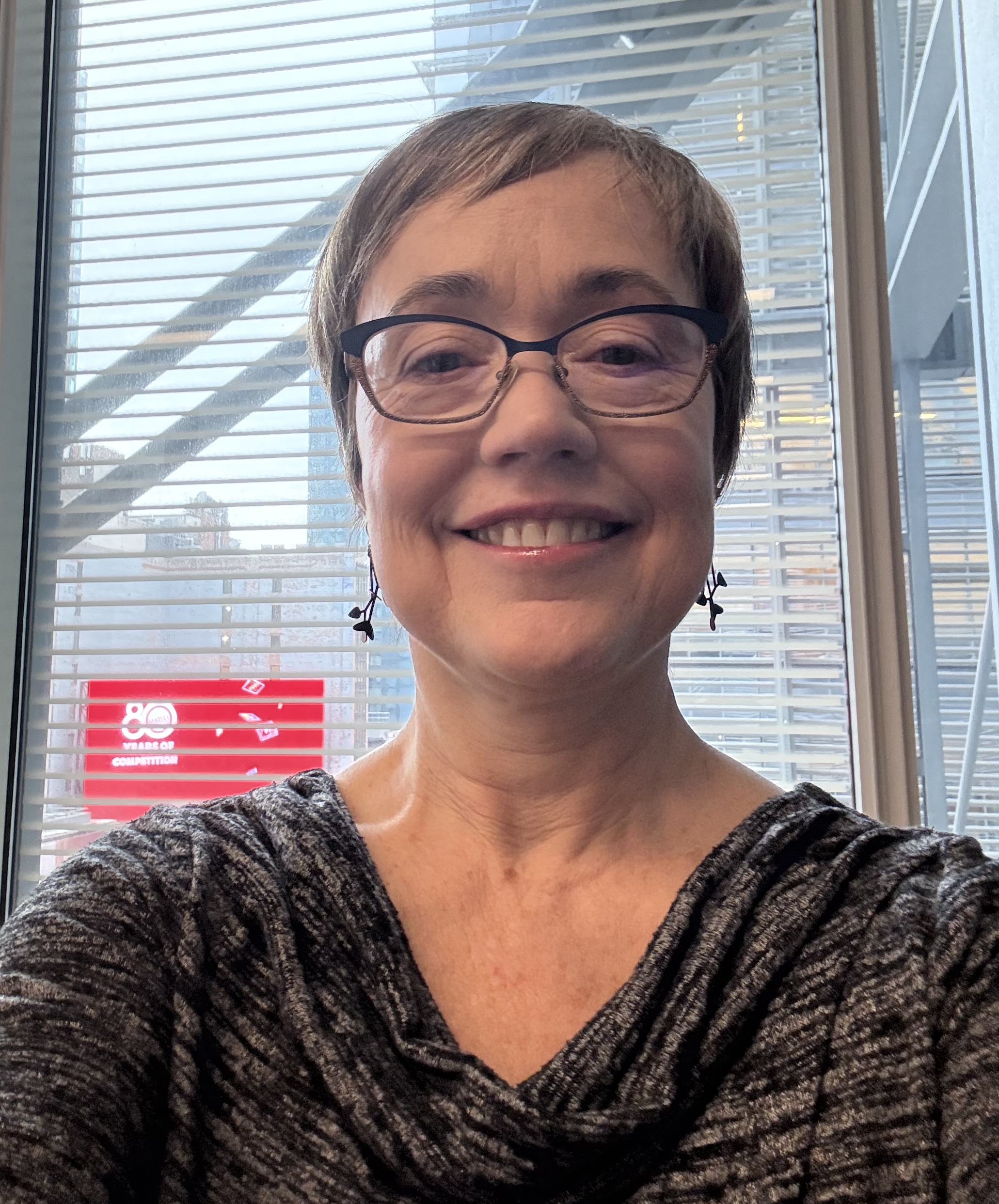
Tracy Bennett was appointed to edit Wordle.

In November 2022, The New York Times appointed Tracy Bennett as Wordle's dedicated editor, responsible for selecting the daily word from a curated list. Speaking to Today in January 2023, she explained that while the words are initially chosen at random, she reviews each selection for suitability. She removes words that have secondary meanings that could be considered profane or derogatory, as well as those that might be unintentionally hurtful or insensitive.

The most frequent player complaints, she noted, stemmed from unfamiliar words, "parer", "rupee" and the U.S.-specific "condo". Bennett also introduced a new editorial approach by occasionally aligning the daily word with significant dates. For example, "BEGIN" was chosen on her first day as editor, "MEDAL" appeared on Veterans Day (November 11), and "FEAST" was selected for Thanksgiving (November 24). This thematic connection was not part of Wardle's original word list. However, not all players welcomed this change. Slate's Lizzie O'Leary, for instance, argued that Wordle should "stay hard and weird", preferring the game's original unpredictability.

==== Usage ====
In 2022, Wordle was the most-searched term on Google worldwide and in the United States. The game's popularity also influenced Google search trends, as players frequently looked up the definitions of daily answers. Seven of the top ten most-searched word definitions that year—cacao, homer, canny, foray, trove, sauté, and tacit—were all Wordle solutions. At the March 2023 Game Developers Conference, New York Times producer Zoe Bell shared insights into Wordle's lasting impact on the company's other online games. While Wordle's player count peaked in March 2022 and later declined, it remained stable at about half of that peak a year later. More significantly, Wordle's popularity has driven increased engagement with other New York Times games, with daily player numbers continuing to rise as of March 2023. In 2025, Pope Leo XIV was reported to be a daily Wordle player.

== Reception and legacy ==
=== Critical reception ===
Wordle has garnered generally positive reviews. The Guardian gave it five out of five stars, lauding it as "a five-minute conundrum that slots pleasingly into even the most harried routine" and likening it to a daily newspaper puzzle. PC Gamer rated it 80/100 and described it as "a fantastic, mesmerizing daily puzzle that's bundled to a community offering some of the best vibes on the internet". Charlie Hall of Polygon criticized the game's board game adaptation, describing it as a "cut-and-paste job" that simply replicated the digital game's mechanics without adding meaningful enhancements for a multiplayer party setting.

=== Adaptations and clones ===
Following Wordle's rapid rise in early 2022, numerous clones emerged, some introducing novel twists to the game's logic. Absurdle, created by British programmer qntm, is an adversarial version where the target word changes after each guess while still adhering to previously revealed hints. Other clones retained Wordle's mechanics but altered the word list, including translations into other languages and themed variations such as Sweardle (featuring swear words) and Weddle (focused on NFL players, named after former safety Eric Weddle). The game has also been ported to older hardware, with versions like GameBoy Wordle for the Game Boy and Wordle DS for the Nintendo 3DS.

Beyond direct clones, many other games adopted the "-le" suffix to signal a connection to Wordle, even with significant gameplay differences. These include Semantle, where players guess words based on semantic similarity, and Squabble, a Wordle battle royale. The game's success also spurred a wave of non-word-based variations, such as Worldle, where players identify a country or territory by its silhouette, with text hints indicating direction and distance from the correct answer; Heardle, a music-identification game acquired by Spotify in July 2022; Poeltl (named after NBA player Jakob Pöltl), where players guess an NBA player based on seven characteristics with colour-coded feedback similar to Wordle; and Globle, where players guess a country on a map where guesses are coloured based on the distance from the correct answer. Some variants expanded Wordle's challenge by requiring players to solve multiple puzzles at once, such as Quordle, which involves solving four puzzles simultaneously and was acquired by Merriam-Webster in January 2023.

A wave of ad-supported Wordle clones also appeared on Apple's App Store in early January 2022, often using the same name while making minimal changes to the gameplay. However, by the end of the month, nearly all of these clones had been removed. After acquiring Wordle, The New York Times moved to protect its intellectual property by filing a trademark application for the game's name and issuing Digital Millennium Copyright Act (DMCA) takedown notices against GitHub repositories hosting clone source code. The New York Times also initiated legal action against Worldle, a location-based guessing game using a similar format, alleging trademark infringement. The developer of Worldle stated they would contest the claim.

==== Others ====
After Wordle gained viral popularity among English-speaking users in January 2022, it was quickly adapted into numerous other languages. An open-source version of the game, created by Hannah Park, was modified by linguist Aiden Pine to accommodate different character sets, enabling broader linguistic accessibility. Pine also published a free step-by-step blog on how to create a custom Wordle. By February 2022, the collaborative project Wordles of the World had documented 350 Wordle-inspired games and resources across several languages. These include adaptations in historical and regional dialects, indigenous languages, and languages without alphabetic writing systems (such as Chinese chengyu and American Sign Language).

The Brazilian version of the game was developed by Google engineer Fernando Serboncini under the title Termo. Originally from São Paulo and based in Canada, Serboncini had previously created games in 2012 and 2015, before beginning to release one title per year from 2018 to 2020, two in 2021, and eventually Termo in 2022. It was launched on January 5, 2022, and reached 100,000 daily players within ten days of release. The sudden growth caused the game's server to crash, leading Serboncini to migrate it to a system with four times the previous capacity. The game has also achieved popularity in Portugal.

=== Television game show ===
NBC announced it was bringing Wordle as a prime time game show sometime in 2027. The show will be a joint product of The New York Times and NBCUniversal, with production by Jimmy Fallon's Electric Hot Dog. Savannah Guthrie will host the program.

== See also ==
- The New York Times Games – Casual games by The New York Times
- Hangman (game)
