= Termo (video game) =

2022 web-based video game

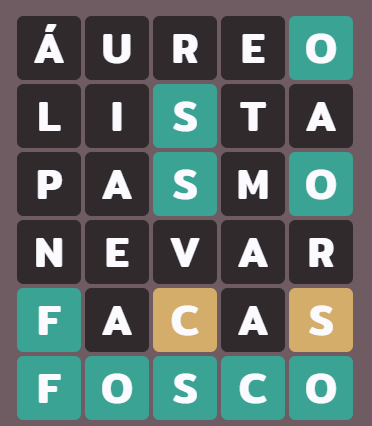
- An example of the game solved in six guesses
- Developer: Fernando Serboncini
- Platform: Web
- Release: 5 January 2022
- Genres: Puzzle, word game
- Mode: Single-player

Termo is a web-based word game created and developed by Fernando Serboncini, a Brazilian software engineer based in Montreal, Canada. Released on 5 January 2022, Termo quickly became popular in Brazil and Portugal, attracting hundreds of thousands of daily players.

It is based on the mechanics of Wordle, the English-language puzzle developed by Josh Wardle. In the game, players have six attempts to identify a secret five-letter Portuguese word, with color-coded feedback given after each guess indicating whether letters are correctly placed, present but mispositioned, or absent from the word. A new word is issued daily and is identical for all players worldwide. Alongside the standard format, two variants are offered, with Dueto challenging players to solve two words simultaneously and Quarteto requiring four to be solved at once.

Serboncini began developing Termo in late December 2021, after encountering Wordle and recognizing the absence of equivalent free word games in Portuguese. The most demanding aspect of development was compiling a lexicon of approximately 18,000 five-letter words, drawn from operating system dictionaries, social media, and legal documents, and refined to exclude obscure terms, proper nouns, and regional vocabulary. Within an hour of launch, the game had attracted over 20,000 players, and by February 2022 it was drawing more than half a million daily users.

== Gameplay ==
Every day, a new five-letter Portuguese word is chosen, and players attempt to identify it within six tries by typing their guesses into the game. After each attempt, feedback is given through a system of color-coded tiles: green indicates that a letter is in the correct position, yellow signals that a letter is present in the word but in the wrong position, and gray shows that the letter is absent from the word. If the correct word is not identified after six attempts, it is revealed at the end of the session, and a new word is introduced the following day.

Each day's answer is drawn from a curated list of approximately 18,000 words, primarily following Brazilian Portuguese orthography and vocabulary. Words containing diacritics are inserted automatically, and words may contain repeated letters. A single word is released each day, and it is the same for all players worldwide. At the start of each session, no hints are provided. Players must submit complete words as guesses rather than individual letters. Players are able to share their performance through a grid of colored squares representing their guesses.

The game is based on the mechanics of Wordle, an English-language puzzle game created by Josh Wardle. The game is accessible exclusively via a web browser and does not feature advertising, in-app purchases, or notifications. Additionally, the game offers a high-contrast mode for colorblind accessibility. Two variants of the original format are also available within the game: Dueto, in which players attempt to solve two words simultaneously, and Quarteto, in which four words must be solved at once.

== History ==
Termo was developed by Fernando Serboncini, a São Paulo-born engineer who works for Google in Montreal, Canada, where he has been part of the Google Chrome team for more than a decade. He is also a member of the Web Hypertext Application Technology Working Group (WHATWG), responsible for maintaining the HTML standard. Serboncini has described game creation as a hobby. Serboncini began playing Wordle, a similar English-language word puzzle designed by Josh Wardle, during Christmas 2021. Impressed by its minimalist design, he decided to create a Portuguese equivalent. He noted that Portuguese had historically lacked free, high-quality word games, in part due to the absence of open-source dictionaries.

The most time-consuming stage of development was compiling a usable lexicon. Over the course of about a week, Serboncini built a list of roughly 19,000 five-letter Portuguese words using material drawn from operating system dictionaries, Facebook posts, and court rulings. He later reported that the number of valid entries stabilized at about 18,000. The list was refined to remove obscure regionalisms, profanity, proper nouns, and verb conjugations. At his mother's request, the word seios ('breasts') was also excluded. By comparison, the programming of the game itself required only two to three days.

The game was launched on 5 January 2022, with the first solution word being festa ('party'). Serboncini initially shared the link with family and a small group of friends. Within an hour, more than 20,000 people were playing. Less than ten days later, Termo reached 100,000 daily players. By mid-January, the number had grown to over 200,000, and by the end of the month it exceeded 400,000. The sudden growth caused the game's server to crash, with the demand requiring multiple upgrades from the original low-cost server to larger systems. In February 2022, the game consistently attracted over half a million users each day. Roughly 85% of the player base is in Brazil, with about 7.5% in Portugal and the remainder spread across other countries. As part of his legacy, Serboncini released the Portuguese word list publicly so that others could create word games in the language.

== Reception ==
Termo gained rapid popularity on social media, where players share their results using color-coded squares that represent their guesses, with news outlets describing Termo as the "Brazilian Wordle". According to data from Google Trends reported by Folha de S.Paulo in February 2022, searches related to the game began to rise in the first week of January and increased consistently in the following weeks. Search behavior related to the games also influenced queries for Portuguese vocabulary. Phrases such as palavras que começam... ('words that start with...') and palavras que terminam... ('words that end with...') experienced notable increases in February 2022 compared with January, rising 160% and 115% respectively. Popular queries included palavras com 5 letras que terminam com a ('five-letter words ending with a') and palavras que começam com h ('words that start with h').

The reliance on Brazilian usage has generated criticism among players in Portugal. Some daily words, such as mamãe ("mommy") and miojo ("instant noodles"), are common in Brazil but unfamiliar or absent in European Portuguese. Other examples, including sachê and turnê, also prompted complaints from Portuguese players on social media. Serboncini has acknowledged these difficulties, noting that he was unaware that mamãe, for instance, does not exist in European Portuguese. He has stated that the word list is occasionally revised to exclude less widespread terms and limit answers to common expressions, although he described this process as challenging.
