= Touch and Go (game) =

Board game

Touch and Go (also published as "Press Ups") is a board game published by Invicta Games in 1974.

== Gameplay ==
Touch and Go is an abstract strategy game.

== Reviews ==
- Games & Puzzles #43
- Jeux & Stratégie #6
