= Mordecai Meirowitz =

Israeli telecommunications expert (born 1930)

Mordechai Meirovitz
- מרדכי מאירוביץ
- Born: 1930 (age 95–96); Romania
- Known for: Mastermind

Mordechai Meirovitz (Hebrew: מרדכי מאירוביץ; born 1930 in Romania) is an Israeli telecommunications expert and games maker.

Meirovitz invented the code-breaking board game Master Mind. After being rejected by leading games companies, he sparked the interest of a Leicester-based company, Invicta Plastics, which restyled and renamed the game. Released in 1971, the game sold over 50 million sets in 80 countries, making it the most successful new game of the 1970s.

In Israel, the game is marketed as Bul pgi'a (Hebrew: בול פגיעה).

== See also ==
- Israeli inventions and discoveries
