= Squabble (video game) =

2022 web-based battle royale game

- Front page
- Developer: Ottomated
- Platform: Web
- Release: February 2, 2022
- Genres: Battle royale, word game
- Mode: Multiplayer

Squabble is a 2022 web-based battle royale and word game created by Ottomated. The game combines the gameplay of Wordle, a word game created by Josh Wardle and bought by The New York Times, and battle royale mechanics. Released in February 2022, Squabble received positive reviews from journalists, who focused primarily on the fast paced gameplay.

== Gameplay ==
Squabble combines Wordle, a word game created by Josh Wardle and acquired by The New York Times, and battle royale mechanics. There are two modes in Squabble: Blitz and Squabble Royale. Blitz, where 2 to 5 players compete, and Squabble Royale, with 6 to 99 players. Each player has a health bar decreasing every second. Players must consecutively solve Wordle puzzles by guessing a five-letter word within six tries. When they guess letters correctly, an opponent gets damaged, and the player's health is restored. Incorrect guesses can subtract the player's HP. If a player loses all of their HP, they are eliminated. The last player remaining wins the game. After a game, players may view others players' grids in replay mode. Unlike Wordle, Squabble features no limit on how many times the player can play per day.

== Release and reception ==
Squabble was created by Ottomated. They announced the game on Twitter on February 2, 2022. Upon release, several journalists noted the game's frantic gameplay. CNET's Mark Serrels said "Squabble is crazy, and may cause you to have a mental breakdown, but I recommend playing it at least once". PC Gamer's Christopher Livingston was more critical of the game, describing it as taking a "nice comfy no-pressure word-guessing game I play in bed" and turning into a "furious frenzy of typing the first word that pops into my head." Blaine Polhamus of Dot Esports wrote that the game was one of the best alternatives to Wordle.

== See also ==
- Babble Royale
- F-Zero 99
- Tetris 99
