= Olivier Auber =

French independent artist and researcher (born 1960)

Olivier Auber (born 1960) is a French independent artist and researcher. He is best known for his project "Poietic Generator" and for having introduced the concept of "Digital Perspective" in the fields of network theory, art, and digital humanities.

== Biography ==
Olivier Auber was born in 1960 in Sainte-Adresse in Normandy, France. He lives and works in Paris and Brussels.

He holds an engineering degree and a Master of Design from the Ecole Nationale Supérieure des Arts et Métiers. His engineering thesis focused on nonlinear optical elements (holograms) for avionics (head-up display). This initial specialization in optics has earned him early in his career as a research engineer, first in the avionics division of Thomson Csf (now Thales Group) and at CERN in Geneva.

In 1984, he takes the status of independent consulting engineer for the Cité des Sciences et de l'Industrie (Paris), then under construction, to work first on the development of exhibits, then quickly as project manager responsible for the design and development of several permanent and temporary exhibitions. As such, between 1984 and 1996, he designed the scenario and led the implementation of several highly technological exhibitions and media on science issues as diverse as: the sun, mathematics, electricity, symmetry in the arts and science, non-verbal human behavior, etc. In this period, he also developed some exhibition projects for other cultural institutions, such as the Centre Georges Pompidou, the Institut du Monde Arabe, the Palais de la Découverte. The creation for the "Expressions et behaviours" exhibition inaugurated in early 1987, marked a milestone in his career, leading him from a predominantly scientific and technical culture to another more artistic and open to all components of the humanities.

At the end of 1987, while working with Tod Machover (MIT Medialab) and Catherine Ikam (artist) for the staging of VALIS, a contemporary music opera based on the novel by Philip K. Dick, he designed what would become his best known work, the "Poietic Generator", a free social artwork for all that can be played in real time over a network. In 1988, this work became the central concept of a monumental, architectural and technological project, one of the seven laureates of the international competition for the creation of the "France-Japan Monument" on Awaji Island in the Bay of Kobe, launched under the aegis of François Mitterrand. This Monument never saw the daylight, but its various implementations were exhibited at the Centre Georges Pompidou (exhibition "Communication et Monumentalité", 1989), the Cité des Sciences et de l'Industrie (exhibition "Machines à communiquer", 1994) and in various galleries and art events including ARSLAB in 1995, where Olivier Auber was awarded the prize "art and science" by the city of Turin, Italy. The exhibition "ARSLAB - The senses of virtuality", sponsored by the City of Turin - Promoter of Fine Arts, was organized by Ars Technica and Extramuseum and was curated by Claude Faure, Maria Grazia Mattei and Franco Torriani

In 1995 still, he was invited to the Ecole Nationale Supérieure des Télécommunications (now Télécom ParisTech) to develop his project, not just on the web, but on an experimental network foreshadowing the future shape of the Internet (Mbone) which allowed him to perform what is considered as the first experience of real-time collective interaction over the Internet without the intermediary of any center.

In 1996, he developed a version of Poietic Generator for the web in order to let every one access to it. Several experiments followed through electronic art festivals and academic research: Ljubljana (1998), X-00 (2000), Human-Computer Interaction Conference IHM-UTC(2002, L3D Lab, University of Colorado at Boulder in (2002), and so on.

In 1997 he co-founded the A+H Culture Laboratory, with Bernd Hoge (architect and urban planner), Emmanuel Mâa Berriet (developer of virtual reality) and Philippe Braunstein (film producer), in order to develop interdisciplinary projects. One of the first is the creation of the Nibelungen Museum in Worms, Germany. One of the pieces in the museum, the virtual reality installation "The treasure of the Nibelungs", inspired by the Poietic Generator, was also exhibited in numerous festivals, including ISEA 2000 (Paris) and Boston CyberArts 2001.

In 2002, he co-founded with Nils Aziosmanoff and Etienne Krieger the company Navidis.

In 2004, he co-founded with visual artist Yann Le Guennec the research group Anoptique that developed dataviz experiences on the Internet. In this regard were conducted several projects in partnership with the Fondation Internet Nouvelle Génération (FING), Orange Lab/France Telecom R&D and INRIA, which led from 2005 on the development of many visualization tools. Anoptique commonly advised organizations such as UNESCO, the Ministry of Culture, and the French Development Agency on their strategy of free software, groupware, interactive mapping, and open data.

In 2010 and 2011, he contributed to the creation of a transdisciplinary Research Chair at Telecom ParisTech devoted to "modeling imaginary" with the help of Dassault Systèmes, Ubisoft, Orange Lab, Peugeot-Citroen, Alcatel Lucent, BNP Paribas, Datar and Minatec.

Since 2012, Olivier Auber divides his time between consultancy, design of cultural and art projects, and research and development on the Poietic Generator. He also contributes to many working groups, as a research associate of the transdisciplinary research group "Evolution, Complexity and Cognition" and the Global Brain Institute directed by Francis Heylighen, and as an active member of the P2P Foundation.

== Theoretical arguments ==
From 1986, Olivier Auber theorized the Poietic Generator as an experience of two new kinds of perspectives, analogous to the spatial perspective of the Renaissance: the "temporal perspective" and the "digital perspective", on which he wrote several papers whose terms were continued in the works of many philosophers and historians of art and science, including Anne Cauquelin, Don Foresta, Gilbertto Prado, Mario Costa, Caterina Davinio, Jean-Paul Fourmentraux, Louis-José Lestocart, Elisa Giaccardi, Edmond Couchot and Norbert Hillaire, Jean-Michel Cornu, Franco Torriani, etc..

== Bibliography ==
=== by Olivier Auber ===
- "ANOPTIKON, une exploration de l'internet invisible", FYP éditions, 2019, ISBN 978-2-36405-181-2
- "(a) P2P money manifesto": MCD review, January 2015
- "IPv6, a new perspective for social networking": conference in Talks of the new industrial world, Centre Georges Pompidou, Institute for Research and Innovation (IRI), Cap Digital, October 2008
- "Game Over, change the Internet": contribution to the Digital Audience of the Secretariat to the Digital Economy, June 2008
- "Digital cartography and territorial development": prospective study commissioned by the Observatory of Digital Territories OTEN, 2008
- "The Net, a Common Good", Liberation under Rebounds, March 2007
- "From the Poietic Generator to the Digital Perspective" in the aesthetic review, led by Anne Cauquelin. January 2005
- "Aesthetics of Digital Perspective", conference ARTMEDIA X, Paris 2004

=== on Olivier Auber ===
- Interview by Judy Malloy, Social Media Archeology and Poetics, ongoing supplement to the MIT Press Book Networked Art Works: in the Formative Years of the Internet, 2019.
- Olivier Auber / démarche générale. Technology Review, MIT, March–April 2008.
- Les nouvelles cimaises. Maison et Parcours Rimbaud, Sonovision, 2004.
- L'Invisible-Monument, Metz, tête de pont d'Aillagon , Libération, 10 May 2003.

== See also ==
- Poietic Generator
