= Space Lines =

Board game published by Invicta Games in 1969

Space Lines is a board game published by Invicta Games in 1969.

== Gameplay ==
Space Lines is an abstract strategy game similar to Qubic.

== Reviews ==
- Galileo #11
- Jeux & Stratégie #7
