= Bulls and cows =

Code-breaking game

Bulls and cows (also known as cows and bulls or pigs and bulls) is a code-breaking mind or paper and pencil game for two or more players. The game is played in turns by two opponents who aim to decipher the other's secret code by trial and error.

Bulls and cows predates the commercially marketed board game version, Mastermind, and its word-based variant predates the gameshow Lingo and web game Wordle. A version known as MOO was widely available for early mainframe computers, Unix and Multics systems, among others.

== Gameplay ==
The game is usually played with four digits, but can be played with any number of digits.

On a sheet of paper, the players each write a four-digit secret number. The digits must be all different. Then, in turn, the players try to guess their opponent's number who gives the number of matches. The digits of the number guessed also must all be different. If the matching digits are in their right positions, they are "bulls", if in different positions, they are "cows". Example:

- Secret number: 4271
- Opponent's try: 1234
- Answer: 1 bull and 2 cows. (The bull is "2", the cows are "4" and "1".)

The first player to reveal the other's secret number wins the game.

The game may also be played by two teams of players, with the team members discussing their strategy before selecting a move.

Another version of the game uses letters in place of numbers, where those letters must spell a five-letter word.

== Computer versions ==
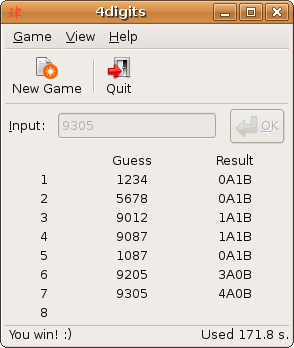
4digits, an open source version of bulls and cows. This software uses "A" to denote "bulls" (digit in the correct position) and "B" to denote "cows" (digit in the wrong position).

Computer versions of the game started appearing on mainframes in the 1970s. The first known version was written by Frank King at the Cambridge Computer Laboratory sometime before the summer of 1970. This version ran on Cambridge's multi-user operating system on their Titan machine. It became so popular the administrators had to introduce systems to prevent it from clogging the system. In 1972, the original Cambridge MOO was ported to the Multics operating system at MIT, and reimplemented on early Unix at Bell Labs.

A version called BASIC MOO was published in the DECUS Program Library for PDP computers and another was available through the DEC Users Society, both dating from 1971. A version written by Lane Hauck in the language FOCAL for the PDP-8 later served as the basis for the handheld game Comp IV by Milton Bradley.

These programs maintained a league table of players' scores, and protecting the integrity of this league table became a popular case study for researchers into computer security.

== Analysis ==
It is proved that any number can be solved within seven turns. The average minimal game length is 26274/5040 ≈ 5.21 turns.

== See also ==
- Jotto, a similar game with words
- Lingo (American game show), a game show that contains word puzzles with similar gameplay
- Mastermind, a commercial board game based on this game
