= Wplace =

Collaborative pixel art website

- Area of Tokyo in Wplace on 13 August 2025
- Available in: 12 languages
- List of languages English; Portuguese; Polish; German; Spanish; Italian; French; Vietnamese; Russian; Ukrainian; Japanese; Mandarin
- Country of origin: Brazil
- Owner: Wplace
- Creator: Murilo Matsubara
- Website: wplace.live
- Registration: Google account required to edit canvas
- Launched: 21 July 2025; 15 months ago
- Current status: Active

Wplace is a collaborative pixel art website developed by Brazilian developer Murilo Matsubara and launched on 21 July 2025, in which users can edit the canvas by changing the color of pixels on the world map. The website is based on r/place, a collaborative project that was hosted on Reddit.

== Overview ==
Inspired by r/place, a recurring collaborative project hosted on Reddit, Wplace enables individual users to edit an online canvas of a world map by changing any of the four trillion square pixels available. Users begin with a limited pool of 30 pixels they can place and regain one spent pixel every 30 seconds as the maximum pool expands by 2 every time the user levels up by drawing a certain amount of pixels. Those limitations encourage users to either work slowly, hoping their progress is not ruined, or collaborate with other users, especially on large-scale projects. The site also features a leaderboard that shows which country and region host the most pixels. Such rules result in frequent wars between users, where every author tries to finish their own picture, sometimes destroying previous or neighboring images.

Users, by leveling up and placing pixels, accumulate "droplets"—a special currency that can be spent on increasing the pool of pixels, regenerating more pixels, changing the user's profile picture, or adding a flag of a chosen country to the user's profile. Users gain 1 droplet for every pixel placed and 500 droplets every time they level up. These purchases are beneficial to creating art; when placing pixels in the country whose flag a user has purchased, 10% of their pixels will be restored. There are a total of 63 colours for users to choose from, with 31 of them (excluding transparent) being completely free, while the other 32 can be bought for 2000 "droplets" each.

The website attracted over a million users in four days, gaining popularity on platforms like TikTok, Reddit, and Twitter. Due to the very high number of concurrent users, the website has experienced many technical issues that blocked leaderboards and prevented new users from registering, despite allowing already existing users to edit the canvas.

On 27 August 2025, the developer of Wplace made a post on Reddit addressing various issues of the platform, including user bans, server downtime, and its "pay to win" model.

== Reception ==
=== Pop culture ===
Users actively draw images from well-known pop culture media, that includes video games, anime, cartoons, music, films, live-action television shows, web series, sports and internet culture trends such as memes. Elements, especially various fictional characters from video games, anime and cartoon franchises like Genshin Impact, Hollow Knight, Honkai: Star Rail, Kirby, Mario, Overwatch, Sonic the Hedgehog, Minecraft, South Park, Touhou Project, My Little Pony: Friendship Is Magic, Umamusume: Pretty Derby, Persona, Zenless Zone Zero, Blue Archive, Undertale, Deltarune, Pokémon, Bocchi the Rock!, Dragon Ball Z, Ace Attorney, and Hatsune Miku: Project Diva are frequently featured on the website. Deltarune is one of the most featured media on the website, with some sources saying the game overruns the site by the amount of artwork related to it present on the website.

==== Tributes ====
Following the death of Grass Wonder, fans of Umamusume: Pretty Derby on Wplace created a tribute to the horse in the Philippines, around San Pablo, with a large mural consisting of a pixel recreation of the character Grass Wonder in Umamusume, holding a bouquet of flowers against a blue sky backdrop, with the message "Farewell, Grass Wonder." Tributes were also drawn in the Alpes-Maritimes department following the death of the French streamer Jean Pormanove.

=== Voids ===
Voiding refers to the act of coloring a part of the game map using a solid color (usually black), in order to create an area with a monochromatic color, either as a background or as a piece of its own without artwork overlaying it. It is a practice carried over from the spiritual predecessor, r/place, into Wplace. In Wplace, due to the nature of the canvas being a world map, voids aim to cover an entire region, country, or other specific area. Typically, this is done collaboratively, through the in-game alliances system. However, it can also be done by individual users without the help of other users.

Voids, like artworks on the site, are typically placed in populated areas and other areas that receive a lot of attention. The existence of voids is linked to destruction, because of the numerous instances in which black voids have been used to destroy artwork. Today, according to the website's Code of Conduct, voiding is allowed as long as it does not cover or destroy artworks.

=== Media activism ===
==== Video game–related activism ====
Wplace has been used as an attempt by video game fans to communicate with corporations through creating art, often in the location of the company's offices. One instance was with fans of the sandbox game Hytale creating a large-scale artwork with the message "#Save Hytale" in Riot Games' headquarters in Santa Monica, California, in protest of the game's cancellation. Several fans of the series Dragon Age used the site to protest EA disallowing the game's developer BioWare from creating remastered versions of their games. The fans use Kirkwall, which shares the same name as the main setting of Dragon Age II to create artworks featuring anti-EA sentiment and boys' love culture.

==== Political activism ====
Users actively draw flags of countries such as the United Kingdom, Brazil, Ukraine, Israel and Palestine.

Area of the Gaza Strip in Wplace on 25 September 2025

Artwork featuring transgender culture and advocacy has been documented on the site, particularly in prominent locations in the UK which were filled with multiple transgender flags and messages. Notably, users started to feature transgender flags near the house of J. K. Rowling due to her previous statements regarding the trans community. The influx of transgender flags and messages has spread outside of the UK and their large prevalence was met with praise among the site's community, with its subreddit making memes about them.

On the canvas, in the Gaza Strip and its surroundings, since the release of the website, numerous pixel art works including Palestinian flags, anti-war slogans, several artworks featuring hearts and other works of art were featured as a sign of protest to the Gaza war. In North America, users showed their dissent against Alligator Alcatraz and Mar-a-Lago in Florida and remembrance art on the site of the Jalisco extermination camp, located in Jalisco, Mexico. In South America, various users from Colombia and Peru practiced activism in support of their respective country's claim on the contested Santa Rosa island.

== See also ==
- Poietic Generator – Social network game played on a two-dimensional matrix
- The Million Dollar Homepage – Website that sold one million pixels on its home page
