= Worldle =

2022 web-based geography game

- Solved Worldle Puzzle of 05/11/26
- Developer: Antoine Teuf
- Publisher: Antoine Teuf
- Platforms: Browser, mobile
- Release: January 2022
- Genre: Puzzle

Worldle is a 2022 web-based puzzle geography game created and developed by French game developer Antoine Teuf. The game was inspired by the web-based word game Wordle.

== Gameplay ==
Worldle tests players' knowledge of geography. They have six guesses to find the country of the day based on the distance from it compared to previous guesses. There are also bonus games within Worldle. These include guessing the flag, bordering countries, and general facts about the country.
