= AB (game) =

Two-player number-guessing game

AB, a variant of the board game Mastermind, is a number guessing game involving two players. The codemaker makes a four-digit number with no repeats, and the codebreaker tries to guess this number in as few moves as possible. When the codebreaker makes a guess, the codemaker says the amount of “A”s, or the correct digits in the number as well as in the right place, and the amount of “B”s, or the correct digits in the number that is not in the right place.
