= Jotto =

Logic-oriented word game

Jotto sheet

Jotto (or Giotto) is a code-breaking pen and paper word game for two players. Each player picks and writes down a secret word and attempts to guess the other's word first during their turn.

== Gameplay ==
Each player picks a secret word of five letters and writes it down privately. Words must appear in a dictionary; generally no proper nouns are allowed. The object of the game is to correctly guess the other player's word first.

Players take turns: on a player's turn, they guess some five-letter word, and the other player announces how many letters in that guess match a unique letter in their secret word. For example, if the secret word is OTHER and the guess is PEACH, the E and H in PEACH match an E and an H in OTHER, so the announced result is "2". (Letters don't need to occur in the same position.) On the next turn, players reverse roles.

Players keep track on paper of each guess and result, crossing out letters of the alphabet that (by deduction) cannot appear in the opponent's secret word. Eventually, one player has enough information to win by making a correct guess.

== History ==
Jotto was invented in 1955 by Morton M. Rosenfeld and marketed by his New York-based Jotto Corp. In the 1970s, copyright passed to the Selchow and Righter Company. It is now made by Endless Games.

== Variations ==
- The most common variation uses words of four letters instead of five.
- Players should agree before playing if secret words can contain duplicate letters.
- Six-Letter (sometimes called 'Word Master Mind', though its logical content places it well beyond Master Mind and Jotto). Known to have been played with pencil and paper in UK computer departments at least as far back as 1970. Each player picks a secret word of 6 letters, and they take turns guessing the other's word. Secret words (sometimes called 'targets') and guesses, must all be real words verifiable in a nominated dictionary. When you guess a word, you find out the number of letters which are perfect matches only. So if you guess PEACHY and the secret word was OTHERS, you get a reply of 0 (because the E and H are in the wrong positions). Even more so than Jotto, this game stretches one's skills in combinatorial logic as well as one's command of the dictionary. The name of the same computer game is Sixicon by Island Software, 1979.
- Five-Letter, like Jotto, requires players to take turns guessing at an opponent's five-letter word. Like Six-Letter, responses only indicate the number of perfect matches. If you guess PEACH and the secret word is PHIAL, the response would be 1 – the P is an exact match, but the A and the H are not. A strong strategy for Five-Letter involves attacking the middle three positions (2, 3, and 4) with vowels.
- The television game show Lingo consists largely of contestants playing a variant of Jotto. In Lingo, the player is told which matching letters are in the correct position, and which are in incorrect positions. Instead of being selected by the contestants, the words are chosen by the show and contestants are given a limited number of guesses.
- Kane Jotto is a form of multi-player Jotto. Each player has a secret word, like the original game. Each round, a player guesses a word and each player goes around stating the number of letters his or her secret word has in common with the guess. The winner correctly guesses the secret words of all other players.
- Three-letter Jotto is played without using pencil and paper. In order that the game not be overly difficult, as it must be done entirely in the head, only perfect matches return a count.

== See also ==
- Lingo – a similar TV show
- Wordle – a similar 2021 web game
- Bulls and Cows – a similar game with numbers
- Mastermind – a similar game with colored pegs
