= Heardle =

2022 web-based music game

- Developer: Omakase Studios
- Publisher: Spotify
- Platform: Browser
- Release: February 2022
- Genre: Puzzle game

Heardle was a web-based music game created by London-based Omakase Studios. Inspired by the web-based word game Wordle, it tested players' knowledge of music.

== Gameplay ==
Gameplay involved attempting to guess the name of a song by listening to six progressively longer snippets of it, from 1 to 16 seconds in duration.

== Development ==
Development of Heardle began in December 2021. The game was released on 26 February 2022. At the time of release, songs were sourced from music streaming service SoundCloud, selected by the developer "semi-randomly" after discovering that curating songs led to better gameplay than selecting them randomly.

In July 2022, Spotify acquired Heardle for an undisclosed amount. They subsequently shut the game down in April 2023.

== Legacy ==
Heardle itself led to clones. Heardle Decades features the same gameplay with different sets of songs, such as from various decades of music, TV themes, or from specific artists. Videogame Heardle features video game music.
