= Quordle =

2022 video game

- Developer: Freddie Meyer
- Publishers: Freddie Meyer; Merriam-Webster
- Programmers: David Mah; Freddie Meyer
- Platform: Browser
- Release: February 2022
- Genre: Word game
- Mode: Single-player

Quordle is a 2022 word game developed and published by Freddie Meyer. Inspired by Wordle and Dordle, Quordle tasks the player to solve four puzzles at once. In January 2023, the game was acquired by Merriam-Webster.

== Gameplay ==
In Quordle, the player has to simultaneously solve four Wordle grids within nine turns. In each turn, they guess a five-letter word; once the player finishes, each letter is colored based on how accurate the player's guess is. Green letters indicate that the letter is correctly placed, yellow letters indicate that it is in the wrong spot, and grey letters indicate that it is not in the word. The player may enter in a practice mode, which allows them to play endless games. New puzzles appear daily.

== Development and release ==
The early prototype of Quordle was developed by engineer David Mah. Freddie Meyer took Mah's prototype, modifying the code. Meyer was inspired by Dordle, another Wordle clone where players must solve two grids at once. Quordle was released in February 2022, and within the first few weeks, Quordle had gained a total of one million players.

In January 2023, Merriam-Webster acquired Quordle for an undisclosed sum. Greg Barlow, the president of the company, stated that the game was "a favorite" within the staff, adding that it would "make a great addition" to the website's selection of games.
