= The Button (Reddit) =

Experimental meta-game on Reddit

- The Button
- Started: 1 April 2015
- Ended: 5 June 2015
- Participants: 1,008,316 accounts
- URL: www.reddit.com/r/thebutton
- Creator: Josh Wardle

The Button was an online meta-game and social experiment that featured an online button and 60-second countdown timer that would reset each time the button was pressed. The experiment was created by Josh Wardle, also known as powerlanguage. The experiment was hosted on the social networking website Reddit beginning on 1 April 2015 (April Fools' Day), and was active until 5 June 2015, the first time that no user pressed the button before the timer reached zero. The game was started by a Reddit administrator.

The Button garnered enthusiasm from Reddit users worldwide, attracting clicks from over one million user accounts. Various websites, browser extensions, and mobile applications were created for tracking the live statistics of the Button and enabling users to visit the Button when the timer dropped below a certain threshold.

The Button's countdown timer reached zero several times due to technical issues, but was reset since button press attempts were still being made. On 5 June 2015, the countdown timer reached zero with no button press attempts, ending the experiment.

== Overview ==
The specific Reddit community (subreddit) for the Button had the standard Reddit appearance but with a molly-guarded button next to a 60-second countdown timer at the top of the page. When the button was clicked by any user, the countdown would reset for every user. The button could only be pressed once by each unique Reddit account created before the event started on 1 April. There was also a cumulative count of all unique users who had clicked the button since its launch. The Button was a light blue color.

All users received a small dot called a "flair" next to their username. Users who had not pressed the button had a grey dot, and users who had pressed it had a dot colored based on the state of the timer when the button was pressed. When hovering the cursor over this colored dot, the time in seconds on the counter when the user clicked the button would be displayed. On the subreddit, users' times and the subsequent flair colors became status symbols.

Flair colors
Time clicked	Color
60s–52s	Purple
51s–42s	Blue
41s–32s	Green
31s–22s	Yellow
21s–12s	Orange
11s–0s	Red
Did not click	Grey
Not able to click	White

== History ==
The button was introduced on 1 April 2015 in a post to the official Reddit blog.

On 5 June 2015, at 21:49:53 UTC, a person with Reddit username "BigGoron" became the last user to press the button (dubbed "The Pressiah" by the community). Sixty seconds later, the countdown timer reached zero and ended two months and four days after it had begun. The button was deactivated, and overlaid with the text "the experiment is over". Six minutes later, Wardle announced that the forum would be archived within ten minutes.

The experiment ended with 1,008,316 logged button clicks.

== Technical issues ==
The Button experienced technical issues which caused it to reach zero despite users pressing it in time. This occurred multiple times and was attributed to database errors by Reddit's administrators. The outages caused community discontentment and some speculation that the subreddit was being gamed by the administrators. Although The Button was revived within a day of the outages, the administrators of Reddit considered closing The Button experiment early.

== Community interaction ==
The inherent segregation on this specific Reddit community (subreddit) led to the development of cult-like groups surrounding specific flairs or beliefs towards the button itself. Each individual cult could be easily identified by the color of its flair, represented by the short time frame in which any user pressed the button. Of the cults, the most basic was the division between those that would press the button, "the pressers", and those that would abstain, "the non-pressers". Others formed around each of the six other colored flairs.

Each cult developed its own beliefs surrounding what would happen when the clock reached zero, and its own public image. Some cults, such as the "grey" flair given to those who would not press the button, or the "red" flair given to those that pressed it when the timer showed 0–11 seconds, were regarded as pretentious and arrogant about their beliefs, and hostile towards newcomers. Others, like the "purple" flair given to those that pressed the button between 52 and 60 seconds, were seen as compassionate and welcoming to new members. Regardless, each cult maintained a public image through the use of dressed and color-coded mascots. In addition, names arose to represent each of the cults, such as "The Emerald Council" for the green flair, or "The Violet Hand" for the purple flair. Eventually the community built around the button referred to the colored flairs not by their color, but by the name given to the cults representing them.

Within the larger group of the grey flair, those who would not press the button, smaller cults formed with unique beliefs to others that also held the grey flair. Of these, the most prominent was the "Knights of The Button". Members of this cult attempted to prevent the button from ever reaching zero by pressing it before the clock could fully descend. The 'Knights' went so far as to create an algorithm associated with a large pool of thousands of "dummy" accounts to press the button automatically before it could reach zero. However, of these accounts, one was not verified to have been created prior to 1 April 2015, and therefore was unable to press the button, permitting it to finally reach zero.

== See also ==
- r/place – Reddit's April Fools' Day event in 2017, 2022, and July 2023.
