= The Million Dollar Homepage =

Website that sold one million pixels on its home page

- The Million Dollar Homepage (as of January 2021)
- Website type: Pixel advertising
- Owner: Alex Tew
- Revenue: $1,037,100
- Website: MillionDollarHomepage.com
- Commercial: Yes
- Registration: None
- Launched: 26 August 2005; 21 years ago
- Current status: Partly active

The Million Dollar Homepage is a website conceived in 2005 by Alex Tew, a student from Wiltshire, England, to raise money for his university education. The home page consists of a million pixels arranged in a 1000 × 1000 pixel grid; the image-based links on it were sold for $1 per pixel in 10 × 10 blocks. The purchasers of these pixel blocks provided tiny images to be displayed on them, a URL to which the images were linked, and a slogan to be displayed when hovering a cursor over the link. The aim of the website was to sell all the pixels in the image, thus generating a million dollars of income for the creator. The Wall Street Journal has commented that the site inspired other websites that sell pixels.

Launched on 26 August 2005, the website became an Internet phenomenon, with copycat websites emerging in response. The Alexa ranking of web traffic peaked at around 127; As of 9 May 2009, it was 40,044. On 1 January 2006, the final 1,000 pixels were put up for auction on eBay. The auction closed on 11 January with a winning bid of $38,100 that brought the final tally to $1,037,100 in gross.

During the January 2006 auction, the website was subject to a distributed denial-of-service attack (DDoS) and ransom demand, which left it inaccessible to visitors for a week while its security system was upgraded. The Federal Bureau of Investigation and Wiltshire Constabulary investigated the attack and extortion attempt.

After a short time, Tew decided to drop out of the business degree program for which he had created the site in the first place. As of 2019, The Million Dollar Homepage was still receiving thousands of daily viewers; however, by 2017, many of the website's links suffered from link rot, causing the URLs to no longer function as originally intended.

== History ==
=== Development ===
From the outset I knew the idea had potential, but it was one of those things that could have gone either way. My thinking was I had nothing to lose (apart from the 50 Euros or so it cost to register the domain and setup the hosting). I knew that the idea was quirky enough to create interest ... The Internet is a very powerful medium.

— Alex Tew, 22 February 2006.

Alex Tew, a student from Cricklade in Wiltshire, England, conceived The Million Dollar Homepage in August 2005 when he was 21 years old. He was about to begin a three-year Business Management course at the University of Nottingham, and was concerned that he would be left with a student loan that could take years to repay. As a money-raising idea, Tew decided to sell a million pixels on a website for $1 each; purchasers would add their own image, logo or advertisement, and have the option of including a hyperlink to their website. Pixels were sold for US dollars rather than UK pounds; the US has a larger online population than the UK, and Tew believed more people would relate to the concept if the pixels were sold in US currency. In 2005, the pound was strong against the dollar: £1 was worth approximately $1.80, and that cost per pixel may have been too expensive for many potential buyers. Tew's setup costs were €50, which paid for the registration of the domain name and a basic web-hosting package. The website went live on 26 August 2005.

The homepage featured a Web banner with the site's name and a pixel counter displaying the number of pixels sold, a navigation bar containing nine small links to the site's internal web pages, and an empty square grid of 1,000,000 pixels divided into 10,000 100-pixel blocks. Tew promised customers that the site would remain online for at least five years – that is, until at least 26 August 2010.

=== Pixel sales ===
Because individual pixels are too small to be seen easily, pixels were sold in 100-pixel "blocks" measuring 10 × 10 pixels; the minimum price was thus $100. The first sale, three days after the site began operating, was to an online music website operated by a friend of Tew's. He bought 400 pixels in a 20 × 20 block. After two weeks, Tew's friends and family members had purchased a total of 4,700 pixels. The site was initially marketed only through word of mouth; however, after the site had made $1,000, a press release was sent out that was picked up by the BBC. The technology news website The Register featured two articles on The Million Dollar Homepage in September. By the end of the month, The Million Dollar Homepage had received $250,000 and was ranked Number 3 on Alexa Internet's list of "Movers and Shakers" behind the websites for Britney Spears and Photo District News. On 6 October, Tew reported the site received 65,000 unique visitors; it received 1465 Diggs, becoming one of the most Dugg links that week. Eleven days later, the number had increased to 100,000 unique visitors. On 26 October, two months after The Million Dollar Homepage was launched, more than 500,900 pixels had been sold to 1,400 customers. By New Year's Eve, Tew reported that the site was receiving hits from 25,000 unique visitors every hour and had an Alexa Rank of 127, and that 999,000 of the 1,000,000 pixels had been sold.

On 1 January 2006, Tew announced that because the demand was so great for the last 1,000 pixels, "the most fair and logical thing" to do was auction them on eBay rather than lose "the integrity and degree of exclusivity intrinsic to the million-pixel concept" by launching a second Million Dollar Homepage. The auction lasted ten days and received 99 legitimate bids. Although bids were received for amounts as high as $160,109.99, many were either retracted by the bidders or cancelled as hoaxes. "I actually contacted the people by phone and turns out they weren't serious, which is fairly frustrating, so I removed those bidders at the last minute", said Tew. The winning bid was $38,100, placed by MillionDollarWeightLoss.com, an online store selling diet-related products. Tew remarked that he had expected the final bid amount to be higher due to the media attention. The Million Dollar Homepage made a gross total of $1,037,100 in five months. After costs, taxes and a donation to The Prince's Trust, a charity for young people, Tew expected his net income to be $650,000–$700,000.

Pixel purchasers included Bonanza Gift Shop, Panda Software, the producers of Wal-Mart: The High Cost of Low Price, British Schools Karting Championship, Book of Cool, Orange, The Times, Cheapflights.com, Schiffer Publishing, Rhapsody, Tenacious D, GoldenPalace.com, 888.com and other online casinos, Independiente Records, Yahoo!, small privately owned businesses, and companies offering get-rich-quick schemes, online dating services, personal loans, free samples, website designs and holidays.

=== DDoS attack ===
On 7 January 2006, three days before the auction of the final 1,000 pixels was due to end, Tew received an e-mail from an organisation called "The Dark Group", and was told The Million Dollar Homepage would become the victim of a distributed denial-of-service attack (DDoS) if a ransom of $5,000 was not paid by 10 January. Believing the threat to be a hoax, he ignored it, but a week later received a second e-mail threat: "Hello u website is under us atack to stop the DDoS send us 50000$." Again, he ignored the threat, and the website was flooded with extra traffic and e-mails, causing it to crash. "I haven't replied to any of them as I don't want to give them the satisfaction and I certainly don't intend to pay them any money. What is happening to my website is like terrorism. If you pay them, new attacks will start," Tew said.

The website was inaccessible to visitors for a week until the host server upgraded the security system, and filtered traffic through anti-DDoS software. Wiltshire Constabulary's Hi-Tech Crime Unit and the Federal Bureau of Investigation (FBI) were called to investigate the extortion and attack; they believed it originated in Russia.

== Reception ==
The crucial thing in creating the media interest was the idea itself: it was unique and quirky enough to stand out. I only had to push the idea a bit in the first few days by sending out a press release which essentially acted as a catalyst. This interest coupled with traditional word-of-mouth created a real buzz about the homepage, which in turn created more interest.

— Alex Tew, 22 February 2006.

Following the September press release that first brought attention to the site, The Million Dollar Homepage was featured in numerous British media articles and programmes. By November 2005, the website had received attention from The Wall Street Journal and media around the world. During a week-long trip to the US, Tew gave several media interviews.

The concept was described as "simple and brilliant", "clever", "ingenious", and "a unique platform [for advertising] which is also a bit of fun". Professor Martin Binks, director of the Nottingham University Institute for Entrepreneurial Innovation, said, "It is brilliant in its simplicity ... advertisers have been attracted to it by its novelty ... the site has become a phenomenon." Popular Mechanics said: "There's no content. No cool graphics, giveaways or steamy Paris Hilton videos for viewers to salivate over. Imagine a TV channel that shows nothing but commercials, a magazine with nothing but ads. That's The Million Dollar Homepage. An astonishing example of the power of viral marketing." Don Oldenburg of The Washington Post was one of the few without praise for the site, calling it a "cheap, mind-bogglingly lucrative marketing monstrosity, an advertising badlands of spam, banner ads and pop-ups." Oldenburg continues, "it looks like a bulletin board on designer steroids, an advertising train wreck you can't not look at. It's like getting every pop-up ad you ever got in your life, at once. It's the Internet equivalent of suddenly feeling like you want to take a shower."

As the final pixels were being auctioned, Tew was interviewed on Richard & Judy, and profiled in the online BBC News Magazine. The Wall Street Journal wrote about The Million Dollar Homepage and its impact on the Internet community. "Mr. Tew himself has taken on celebrity status in the Internet community ... the creative juice ... paints an interesting picture of online entrepreneurship".

== Legacy ==
Tew dropped out of the business degree the site was set up to fund after one term. In 2008, Tew founded Popjam, an Internet aggregation and social networking business. On May 4, 2012, Tew co-founded software company Calm with Michael Acton Smith. As of 2016, Tew was working as an entrepreneur in San Francisco.

As of 2017, only the main page of the website was available, with all sub pages returning a 404 Not Found message. By 2017, the links on the still-live main page of the site demonstrated a considerable degree of link rot. Of the 2,816 original links, 547 (342,000 pixels, sold for $342,000) were dead, and 489 (145,000 pixels, sold for $145,000) redirected to a different domain. The report stated that, of the remaining links, that "the majority do not seem to reflect their original purpose". By April 2019, according to the BBC, approximately 40% of the site's links were suffering from link rot. The site was still receiving several thousands of viewers per day.

=== Similar websites ===
Many other sites sold advertising by pixels. Tew said of the sites, "[they] popped up almost immediately; now there are hundreds of Web sites selling pixels. The copycats are all competing with each other." "...they have very little ads, therefore I guess it's not going too well for them. The idea only works once and relies on novelty ... any copy-cat sites will only have pure comedy value, whereas mine possibly has a bit of comedy PLUS some actual pull in advertising dollars ... so I say good luck to the imitators!"

== See also ==
- Crowdfunding – Collection of finance from backers to fund an initiative
- Poietic Generator – Social network game played on a two-dimensional matrix
- r/place – Online social experiment on Reddit
- Wplace – Collaborative pixel art website
