= R/place =

Online social experiment on Reddit

r/place
- Logo of the original 2017 experiment Logo of the 2022 and 2023 experiments

- The canvas in 2023 on the last day of the event
- Owner: Reddit
- Creator: Josh Wardle
- Website: reddit.com/r/place
- Registration: Reddit account required
- Launched: Original launch: April 1, 2017; 9 years ago Second launch: April 1, 2022; 4 years ago Third launch: July 20, 2023; 3 years ago
- Current status: Dormant

r/place was a recurring collaborative project and social experiment hosted on the content aggregator site Reddit. Originally launched on April Fools' Day 2017, it has since been repeated again on April Fools' Day 2022 and on July 21, 2023.

The 2017 experiment involved an online canvas located at a subreddit called r/place. Registered users could edit the canvas by changing the color of a single pixel with a replacement from a 16-color palette. After each pixel was placed, a timer prevented the user from placing any more pixels for a period of time varying from 5 to 20 minutes (depending on whether the user had verified their email address). The idea of the experiment was conceived by Josh Wardle.

Over a million users edited the canvas, placing a total of approximately 16 million pixels, and, at the time the experiment was ended, over 90,000 users were actively viewing or editing the canvas. The experiment was commended for its representation of the culture of Reddit's online communities, and of Internet culture as a whole.

== Overview ==
The experiment, during the 2017 edition, was based in a subreddit called r/place, in which individual registered users could place a single colored pixel (or "tile") on an online canvas of one million (1000 x 1000) pixel squares, and wait a certain amount of time before placing another. In 2017, the waiting time varied from 5 to 20 minutes throughout the experiment, and the user could choose their pixel's color from a palette of sixteen colors. The 2022 edition started with the same size and colors as 2017, but the canvas was later expanded to four million (2000 x 2000) pixel squares, and the palette gradually gained sixteen more colors for a total of 32. The 2023 edition also started with the same size as the 2022 and 2017 editions (1000 x 1000), and started with 8 colors. It was later expanded to 2 million (2000 x 1000) pixel squares, with 16 colors, then it expanded to 6 million (3000 x 2000) pixel squares, with 32 colors.

Reddit administrators have the ability to place as many pixels as they want and can use this ability to remove offensive content from r/place. Guidelines have outlined this content as nudity, hate speech, targeted harassment, or otherwise objectionable content. This power was illustrated in 2023 when messages expressing violence towards Reddit CEO Steve Huffman as well as some sexual imagery was removed.

== History ==
=== 2017 experiment ===
The final product of the original 2017 r/place experiment

The early hours of the experiment were characterized by random pixel placement and chaotic attempts at image creation. Among the first distinct sections of the canvas to emerge was a corner of entirely blue pixels (named "Blue Corner") and a homage to Pokémon. As the canvas developed, some established subreddit communities, such as those for video games, sports teams and individual countries, coordinated their user efforts to claim and decorate particular sections. This frequently created conflict between communities competing for space on the canvas. Overall, thousands of communities were involved.

Other sections of the canvas were developed by communities and coordination efforts created specifically for the event. Several works of pixel art sprouted from the collaboration of these communities, such as fictional characters, Internet memes, flags, and recreations of famous pieces of artwork such as the Mona Lisa and The Starry Night. Several self-declared "cults" also formed to create and maintain various emblematic features such as the (black) void, engulfing art in nothing but black, the green lattice, the aforementioned blue corner, and a multi-colored "rainbow road". At the time of the experiment's end on 3 April 2017, over 90,000 users were viewing and editing the canvas, and over one million users had placed a total of approximately 16 million pixels. An analysis found that the final version of the 2017 experiment consisted of art from over 800 communities.

r/place was commended for its colorful representation of the Reddit online community. The A.V. Club called it "a benign, colorful way for Redditors to do what they do best: argue among each other about the things that they love". Gizmodo labelled it as a "testament to the internet's ability to collaborate". A number of commentators described the experiment as a broader representation of Internet culture. Some also commented on the apparent relationship between the makeup of the final canvas and the individual communities within Reddit, which exist independently but cooperate as part of a larger community. Newsweek called it "the internet's best experiment yet", and a writer at Ars Technica suggested that the cooperative spirit of r/place represented a model for fighting extremism in internet communities. The experiment did receive some criticism for the lack of protection from bot usage where users used scripts and macros to automatically draw on the canvas.

Color palette of 2017

=== 2022 experiment ===
The final product of the 2022 r/place experiment

On 28 March 2022, a reboot of r/place was announced. It began on 1 April 2022, and lasted for three and a half days, including two expansions of the canvas to allow for more space. The color palette was also expanded on the second and third days. Unlike in 2017, individual subreddits immediately began to coordinate in designing pixel art, and large communities were formed on Discord and Twitch in attempts to expand existing art, replace defaced pixels, and superimpose new images over existing ones. By the end of the five-day experiment, 160 million pixel changes were operated by over 10.5 million users, at an average pace of about 2 million pixels placed per hour. Of these pixel changes, about 26 million were redundant (same color as previously on the same pixel, but by a different user). During the final few hours before the 2022 Place event ended, Reddit restricted users to placing only white pixels. The entire canvas was gradually filled with white space, making it end up looking the same way it began, entirely white.

References to popular culture, Internet memes and politics were commonly visible. Fandom communities participated by creating representative illustrations of their respective subcultures. Similar to 2017, much of the artwork was country flags. This included support for Ukraine in the Russian invasion of Ukraine, where Ukrainian president Volodymyr Zelenskyy was depicted with sunglasses, and the community that drew the Canadian flag struggled to properly draw the flag's maple leaf.

Popular streamers on Twitch intervened in the event by instructing their viewers to quickly draw logos and symbols, often over existing images. The streamer Félix Lengyel, better known online as xQc, peaked with 233,000 concurrent viewers on his stream because of the event, a personal record. Lengyel's viewers would often get banned by Reddit admins, and Lengyel said that he had received more death threats in a single hour than he had received in six years of streaming.

Color palette of 2022 (day 1)

Color palette of 2022 (day 2)

Color palette of 2022 (day 3 and 4)

=== 2023 experiment ===
Reddit relaunched the r/place collaborative project on July 20, 2023, under the tagline "Right Place, Wrong Time", amid several unpopular decisions made by the company which had soured Reddit users, including one that had led to the API controversy which affected Reddit's third-party apps. While announcing the return, Reddit stated: "Hey, what better time to offer a blank canvas to our communities than when our users and mods are at their most passionate… right?"

Within the first day of the 2023 experiment, many writings of "fuck spez" ("spez" being Reddit CEO Steve Huffman's Reddit user name) were placed onto the canvas, some large and some small. Another canvas writing, found among art of Germany, stated: "u/spez ist ein Hurensohn" which translates to "u/spez is a son of a bitch". The Messenger website reported that an r/place artwork of "spez" under a guillotine was removed by Reddit; when The Messenger asked Reddit to comment, Reddit stated that it was enforcing its rules (which do not allow targeted hate of individuals). Meanwhile, several other canvas writings simply stated "API". There was also a canvas writing, "never forget what was stolen from us", which endorsed the Save3rdPartyApps community. During canvas expansions, more protests against Huffman appeared, such as the message "spez = twat" done by users making British-themed art.

In addition to art protesting Reddit, many of the early artworks were flags, plus a multi-colored canvas writing of "DICKS". Among the most notable contributions came from users from the Touhou Project, osu!, and Hatsune Miku subreddits, who collaborated to re-animate the shadow-art music video for "Bad Apple!!" on the canvas. Artworks were also created featuring the game Genshin Impact, cats with sunglasses, a Pokémon card of Charizard, and a tribute to the deceased Minecraft YouTuber Technoblade.

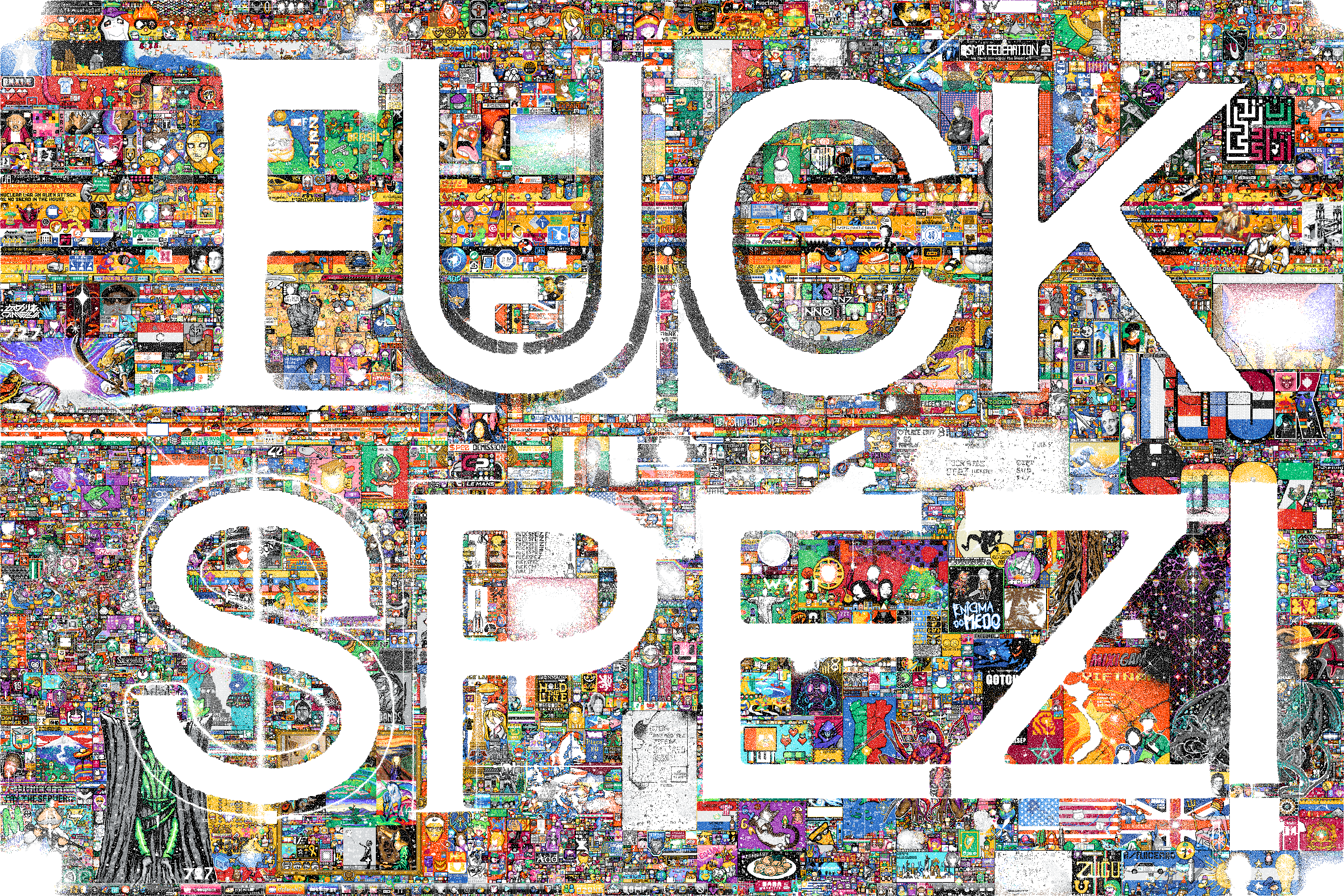
Reddit users collaborated during the final hours of the 2023 experiment to protest the 2023 Reddit API controversy; "Spez" refers to Reddit CEO and co-founder Steve Huffman.

The canvas was expanded six times, and the project concluded on July 25, 2023. During the final hours, users were limited to placing greyscale-colored tiles. Users coordinated to spell out "FUCK SPEZ!" in giant white letters in the centre of the board as part of the protest. The entire canvas was eventually filled with white space by the end of the project.

Color palette of 2023 (day 1)

Color palette of 2023 (day 2)

Color palette of 2023 (day 3)

Color palette of 2023 (day 4, 5 and 6)

== Media response ==
The first experiment was praised for creating a sense of collectivism at a time when the Internet was to a great extent fractured and polarized. The Washington Post compared Place to The Million Dollar Homepage, a 1000-by-1000-pixel website where each pixel was sold for a dollar in 2005. The Conversation observed that, while the experiment demonstrated the ability of cooperation in the Internet to express people's passions, Place also showed the toxicity and exclusion of some communities. The 2022 edition of the experiment caused Reddit's daily active users to reach an all-time peak. Kotaku welcomed the 2022 return of the experiment, saying: "In an era where so much of the modern internet is trash, r/place has returned and it's still really cool."

Media discourse of the 2023 edition was overshadowed by coverage of recent discontent between Reddit and its userbase. The Verge commented that the edition was done "perhaps at the worst possible time", as some Reddit users were still "furious" over Reddit's recent decisions to charge fees for its API, to delete its chat history, and to shut down the Reddit Gold system. Polygon observed after the conclusion that it was "different" from the previous editions, and that it was ultimately "defined by the way some Redditors used the canvas to protest Reddit CEO Steve Huffman".

== Legacy ==
=== Atlas ===
After the 2017 experiment, an atlas of r/place was independently developed by Roland Rytz, featuring a snapshot of the final canvas, and an interactive catalog with descriptions of its different sections.

A new atlas based on the same software was initiated for the subsequent 2022 experiment by student Stefano Haagmans. This iteration later introduced new features, such as a timeline by which to view the development of the canvas over time.

=== Wplace ===
In 2025, the website Wplace was launched. Inspired by r/place, it allows users to place pixels on the world map, instead of an empty canvas. Users begin with a limited pool of 30 pixels that they can place, and regain one spent pixel every 30 seconds as the maximum pool size expands the more user draws.

== See also ==
- Poietic Generator, a similar collaborative pixel art work created in 1986
- The Button (Reddit), an April Fools' Day experiment in 2015
- The Million Dollar Homepage
