= Poietic Generator =

Social network game played on a two-dimensional matrix

The Poietic Generator is a social-network game designed by Olivier Auber in 1986; it was developed from 1987 under the label free art thanks to many contributors. The game takes place within a two-dimensional matrix in the tradition of board games and its principle is similar to both Conway's Game of Life and the surrealists' exquisite corpse.

However, it differs from these models in several respects. It is not an algorithm like Conway's, but human players who control in real time the graphic elements of a global matrix, based on one unit per person. Unlike the exquisite corpse, in which there are always hidden parts, here all the players' actions are visible at all times by each of them. Unlike board games, there is no concept of winning or losing, the goal of the game is simply to collectively draw recognizable forms and to observe how people create them together.

The name "Poietic Generator", derived from the concept of autopoiesis in life sciences (Francisco Varela), and of poietic in philosophy of art (Paul Valéry, René Passeron), illustrates the process of self-organization at work in the continuous emergence of the global picture. Since its inception, the Poietic Generator has been designed as part of a wider action research to create an "Art of Speed".

== Rules of the game ==
Every player draws on a small part of a global mosaic formed by the dynamic juxtaposition of those parts, which are manipulated by all the participants (eventually it will be possible for several thousand players to play simultaneously). Every player can therefore change the sign in their square, depending on the overall state of the image, which itself depends on the actions of all the individual players. Out of this cybernetic loop emerges a kind of narrative: autonomous forms, sometimes abstract, sometimes figurative, appear in a completely unpredictable manner and tell stories.

Images of the Poietic Generator

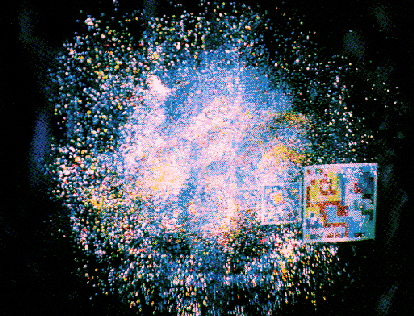
Illustration of the concept (1988)

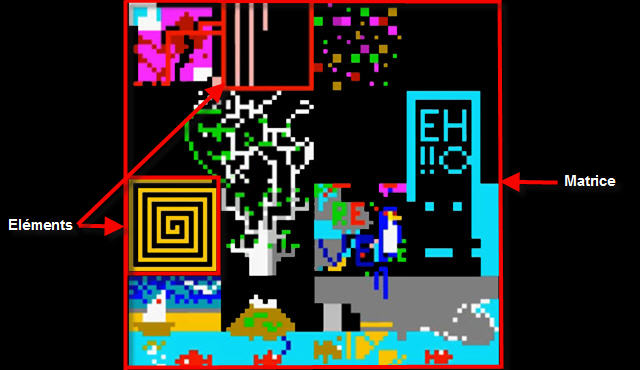
Each player draws on one element of the total matrix

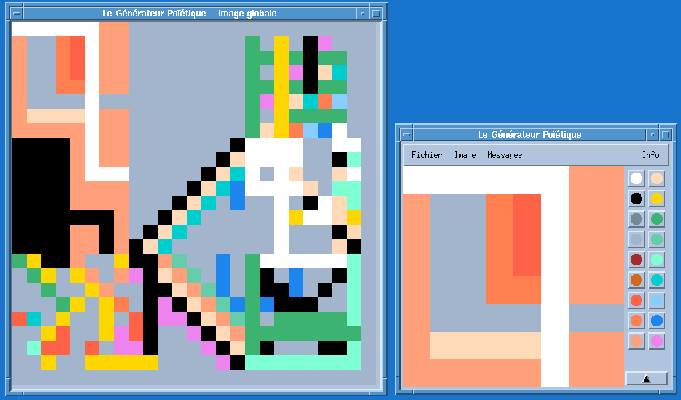
Interface, Multicast version (1994)

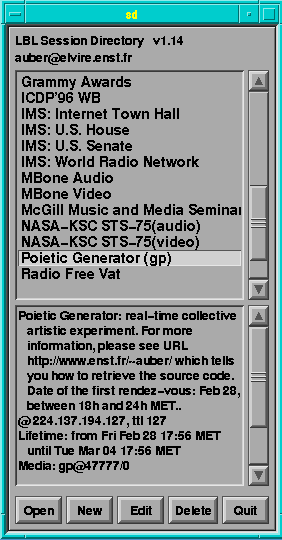
Announcement of a session on the Mbone (February 1996). Screenshot of the "session directory" (Lawrence Berkeley National Laboratory)

Recording the first real-time group interaction without any center (1996)

Recording of a web experiment, X-00 festival (2000)

Recording of an experiment with the "Elmediator" digital public space (2005-03-23)

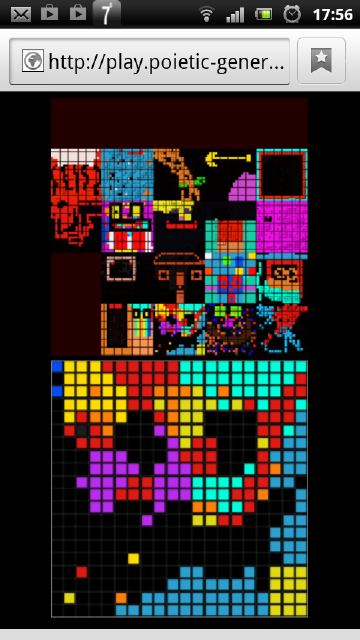
Mobile phone user interface (2012)

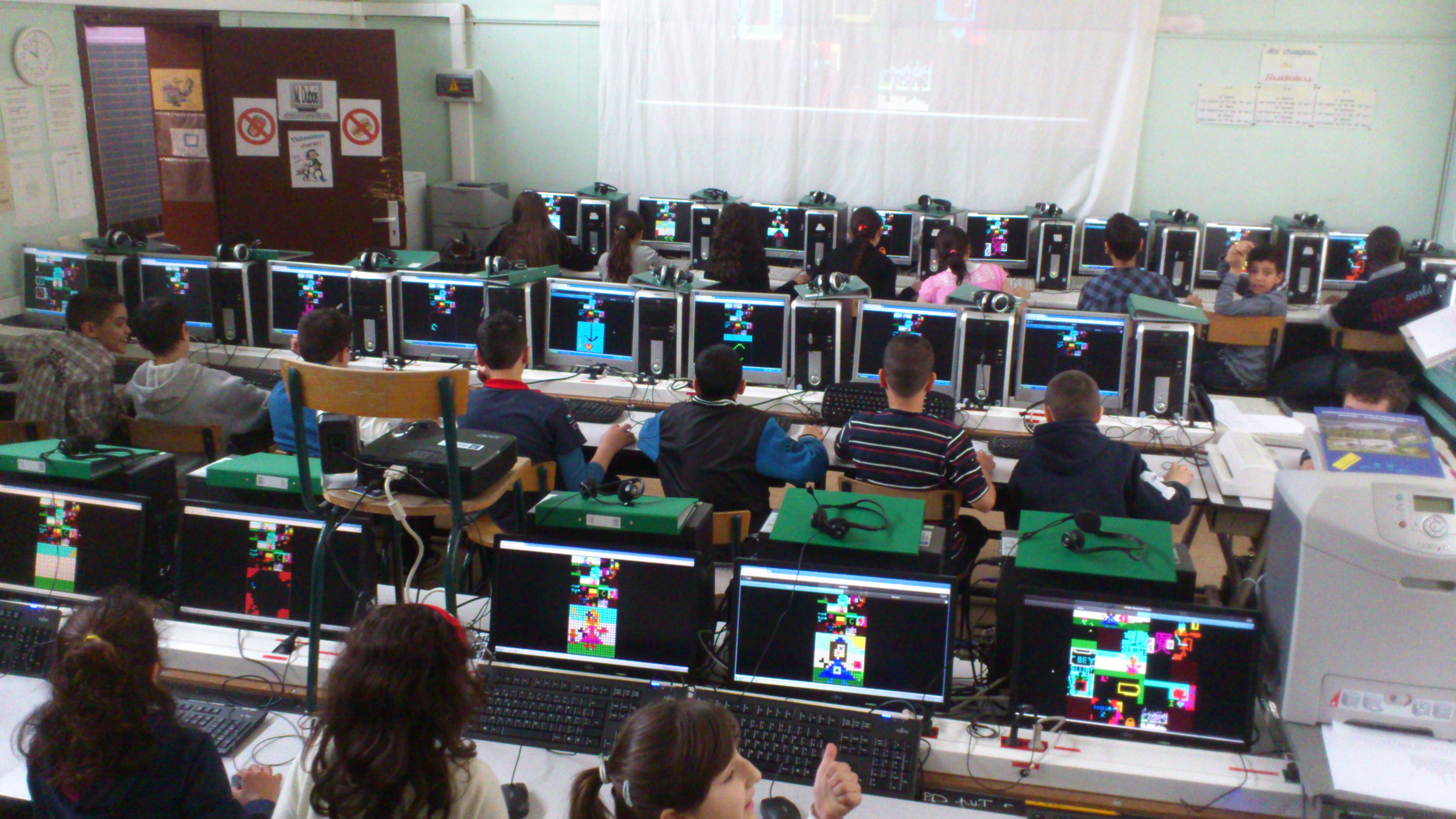
Poietic Generator classroom experiment in Brussels (2013)

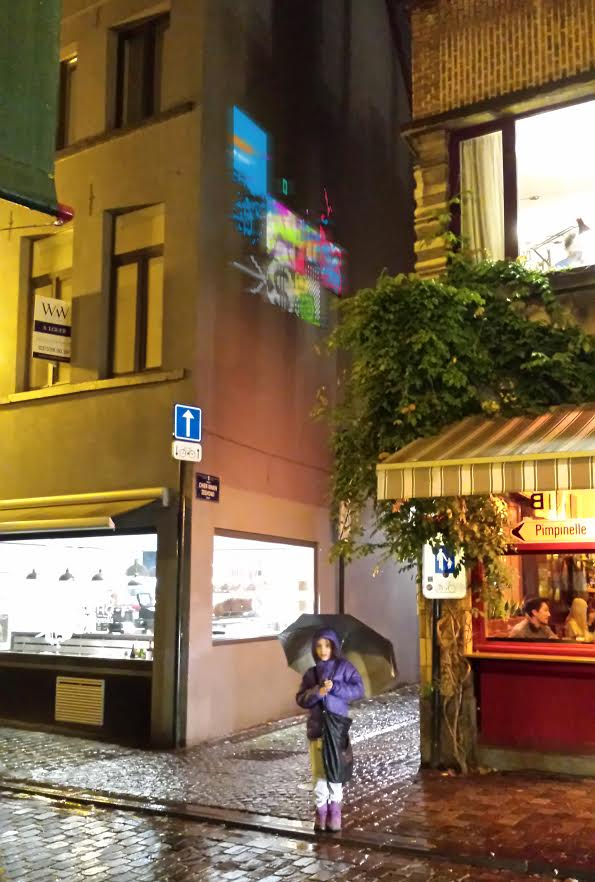
First permanent urban display, Rue du Chien Marin, Brussels. Dec. 2013.

In practice, each player can draw (using a graphics tablet) on a very simple image. This image is limited in size (20×20 pixels) by design. This was done to prevent a single player from drawing figurative signs by themselves. The overall image is continuously formed in the style of a spiral, that is to say the sign of the first player occupies the whole image, and the signs of the newcomers are juxtaposed in the first winding around it, and so on. If a player forfeits the game, their sign immediately disappears and its position remains empty until another player occupies it. A zoom in/zoom out feature ensures that the image, constituted by the juxtaposition of all signs, is permanently visible to all the players.

== Versions ==
The Poietic Generator runs on two types of architecture, a centralized network (for versions 1, 3, 4), or an ad hoc distributed network capable of implementing the multicast protocol (case version 2). Therefore, no location in the network plays a particular role and according to the rules of the Poietic Generator, an "all-all" interaction may take place without the intervention of any kind of control center.

1. Videotex version, developed in C for the French Minitel system (1987)
2. IP Multicast version, developed in C for the Internet Mbone (1995)
3. IP Unicast version, developed in Java for the Web (1997)
4. Mobile version developed in Ruby on Rails and JavaScript (2012)

This latest version is available on the web, via Android mobile phone, iPhone / iPad, via Facebook, and has a reference site.

== Experiments ==
Since 1987, the Poietic Generator (various versions) inspired many experiments in diverse contexts. The first public experiment was at the Centre Georges Pompidou in 1990 as part of the "Communication and monumentality" exhibition. Other museums, art galleries, digital public spaces, festivals, and international conferences, etc. then followed, including the 1991 "Communicating Machines" exhibition by the Cité des Sciences et de l'Industrie (Paris).

Several experiments were performed on the periphery of academic research. For instance, experiments were conducted in particular at Telecom ParisTech (where Olivier Auber was a guest artist between 1994 and 1997), during the Internet Mbone experiment (with Lawrence Berkeley National Laboratory and Xerox PARC), and at other laboratories. The subjects of the experiments were diverse: network protocols, the process of emergence of forms, human-machine interfaces, collective intelligence, group behavior, etc.

Since 1997, the Poietic Generator is accessible to everyone on the web as a work of free art (under Free Art License from 2002). At the request of various groups of artists, teachers or researchers, this led to several hundred recorded game sessions, some of them commented. In several of these sessions, 70 players participated simultaneously. Several experiments were in kindergarten, elementary and secondary schools (including one experiment linking multiple classrooms).

The most recent event was in the spring of 2011 when 70 people responded to a call on the France Culture radio station to finance the mobile version of the Poietic Generator via the crowd-funded platform This version is currently online (2012).

== Position in art history ==
Several art historians and theorists, including Don Foresta, Gilbertto Prado, Mario Costa, Caterina Davinio, Jean-Paul Fourmentraux, Louis-José Lestocart, Elisa Giaccardi, Edmond Couchot and Norbert Hillaire, Annick Bureaud, Judy Malloy recognize the Poietic Generator as one of the historical works of digital art, interactive art, generative art and Net.art. Note that the Poietic Generator was born at the time of Minitel, before the invention of the Web (1994), and implemented from 1995 onwards on experimental Multicast networks foreshadowing IPv6. The introduction of the Minitel in France, offered, for the first time in the world, an easy way to implement telematic art. Several French artists attempted somewhat similar experiments, but none of them had the durability of Poietic Generator.

Anne Cauquelin, who deals with the mechanisms of the "system of art" in several of her works, considers the Poietic Generator to be the prototype of a new "cognitive art". This new "cognitive art", following Marcel Duchamp, Yves Klein and Andy Warhol, re-institutes the task of questioning again, and in a more radical way, the "doxa of art".

Like in the Renaissance, art becomes (a) heuristic, a type of probe with the task to explore a continent.

Since 1987, the Poietic Generator directly inspired multiple variations and derivative works. Some of them developed by its original author based on his own research process, some of them by other artists and/or researchers, especially Yann Le Guennec and fr:Albertine Meunier. It has also initiated various experiments with some communities, including some contributors of Wikipedia. As a model, the Poietic Generator directly inspired the work of some architects, planners, social scientists and anthropologists. Indirectly, the Poietic Generator probably inspired many other artists and designers too.

In other respects, many commercial games have partially taken up the principle of the Poetic Generator (the act of dropping one or more 2D or 3D pixels into a more or less synchronous collective space), notably The Million Dollar Homepage (2005), Minecraft (2009), Place (Reddit) (2017), etc.

== Theoretical aspects ==
=== Modelling ===
Jean-Paul Fourmentraux, in his classification of Net.art devices, quotes the Poietic Generator as one of the few representatives of the "alteraction" devices category. These types of devices support processes of pure synchronous human communication, free from algorithmic control or introduction of external data. This alteraction process, envisioned as "an intermediate action which makes one become other" (Philippe Quéau), lies outside the field studied by the general theory of games, as its branch covering multiplayer games (coordination games, cooperative games) which does not consider the emergence of meta-levels: specifically the "becoming other". According to testimony, the Poietic Generator has an amazing ability to immerse its players in a learning process of social phenomena: it gives not only the possibility to live a kind of "conversation", but in some degree, to access to its model by observing and interpreting autopoietic phenomena, that is to say the "life", which takes place there. According to Olivier Auber, there would be in the Poietic Generator, intrusion of eigenfrequencies, similar to those existing in other autopoietic systems (cell, cerebral cortex, etc.). Despite their apparent complexity, these temporal phenomena (oscillations between structure and chaos, complexity and simplicity) could be analyzed, even "mathematised", particularly in the light of the simplicity theory (Jean-Louis Dessalles). Structuring phases corresponds to a "becoming other" (Quéau) and a greater "simplicity" (Dessalles). The emergence of these kinds of paradigm shifts would be both unexpected and deterministic.

=== Perspectives ===
The Poietic Generator may be seen as a generic model of multiple complex systems (informational, urban, economic, ecological, etc.) to which everyone is confronted daily. But unlike these systems, often opaque about their prerequisites, their rules and infrastructure, the Poietic Generator is perfectly transparent: "everything is known or knowable", in particular the fact that it operates either centrally or without any center. According to Olivier Auber, these two architectures, centered or not, are achieving some forms of "perspective" (within the meaning of the Renaissance) in which the vanishing point lies, in the first case, in a physical center (the server), in the second in a "code" under cover of which the network is sharing information (its sign of recognition in some way). He speaks in the first case of a "temporal perspective" because it is in the center where emerges moment by moment the "proper time" of the network (its rhythmic pulsations). In the second case, he speaks of a "digital perspective" because it is a "code" (an arbitrary number) which is the guarantor of the emergence of the proper time of the network in each of its nodes. These two perspectives are of course not visual as is the case of the spatial perspective, but they share with it some topological and symbolic attributes. In particular, one can speak of "legitimate perspective", as Alberti did in the Renaissance. The Poietic Generator as an Ideal city, implements these two non-visual perspectives, described by Oliver Auber as "anoptical perspectives," as perfectly and obvious as possible. Throughout the game, players can gradually take a cognitive step back, and by analogy grasp in thought the nature of the perspectives in question. The hypothesis of Olivier Auber is that these perspectives are exercised within the framework of "real" systems, opaque and complex as mentioned above, and that they shape the imagination and judgment, that is to say the doxa of those who are enrolled in it.

In attempting to uncover the "anoptical perspectives", the Poietic Generator positions itself as a metagame which invites a questioning of the processes of social interaction, especially when they are mediated by technological devices interacting with social networks. For Olivier Auber, the Poietic Generator, as a model and experience available to all, could contribute to "a certain conceptual knowledge (dianoia) of how the doxa is formed and exercised on us, especially through technology". At a time when technical objects are close to the body and are preparing to invade it, the Poietic Generator could help us by providing "a set of conceptual tools for the new "perspecteurs" (Abraham Bosse) that we could all become" in order, he says, to "rethink the imagination of the technology in full light".

== Reception by the institutions of research, culture and media ==
Attempts like this are crucial to emancipate the technology from the status a mere instrument for defined purposes, and to recognize the role that it should have as a creator of culture and practices.

Since the 1990s, many scientists in all disciplines, mentioned the Poietic Generator as a model which may help to rethink the cultural, even anthropological changing, latent in networks, and especially emphasized the urgency of a "redefinition of the notion of authorship". Some of these researchers brought in a personal support to attempts to practice large-scale experiments using channels such as broadcast television stations, museums, public places, etc. Without listening and support from these institutional broadcasters, very few of these projects have been successful. Handicapped by its transdisciplinary or even "undisciplinary" nature, and naturally questioning the legitimacy of human organizations to which it is dealing with, the action research on the Poietic Generator has never found any other field to flourish as the Internet itself. Nevertheless, the Poietic Generator and writings of its author are quoted in many academic thesis, and in at least one "100% plagiarized".

== See also ==
- Autopoiesis – System capable of producing itself
- Poiesis – Concept in semiotics
- Game classification – Taxonomy of game activities
- Game theory – Mathematical models of strategic interactions
- Doxa – Greek word meaning common belief or popular opinion
- Telematic art – Art using telecommunications networks
- Net.art – Group of artists that use the Internet as their medium
- r/place – Online social experiment on Reddit
