= Social experiment =

Psychological or sociological research

A social experiment is a method of psychological or sociological research that observes people's reactions to certain situations or events. The experiment depends on a particular social approach where the main source of information is the participants' point of view and knowledge. To carry out a social experiment, specialists usually split participants into two groups — active participants (people who take action in particular events) and respondents (people who react to the action). Throughout the experiment, specialists monitor participants to identify the effects and differences resulting from the experiment. A conclusion is then created based on the results. Intentional communities are generally considered social experiments as each is a practical application of a theory.

Social psychology offers insight into how individuals act in groups and how behavior is affected by social burdens and pressures. In most social experiments, the subjects are unaware that they are partaking in an experiment as to prevent bias; however, this may bring ethical issues (see ethics section). Several "actors" or "plants" are used to study social behaviors. Companies have also used social experiments to collect consumer data and their opinions about a product or a particular topic.

== History ==
In 1895, American psychologist Norman Triplett constructed one of the earliest known social experiments, in which he found out that cyclists rode their bikes faster when racing against another person than when they raced against a clock. Norman found similar results, through another experiment, where he asked children to turn fishing reels both alone and with other children present. Field social experiments had proved to be efficient as they reflect real life due to their natural setting.

The social experiments commonly referred to today were conducted decades later. These experiments took place in a laboratory or other controlled setting. An example of this was Stanley Milgram's obedience experiment in 1963. Social experiments began in the United States as a test of the negative income tax concept in the late 1960s and since then have been conducted on all the populated continents.

During the 1970s, criticism of the ethics and accusations of gender and racial bias led to a reassessment of both the field of social psychology and the conducted experiments. While experimental methods were still employed, other methods gained popularity.

Social experiments are sometimes used to evaluate utopian proposals. Such was the Utopia Experiment which took place in Scotland in 2006.

== Ethics ==
Social experimentation has raised many ethical concerns, due to its manipulation of large population groups, often without the consent or knowledge of the subjects. In some instances, social experimentation has been staged unknowingly to the viewer to promote the image of the individual or for the pure purpose of generating controversy.

Researchers also believed that the impact of Informal Social Experiments via social media videos may have negative consequences on formal social marketing research as well as the society in general, detailing that while Informal Social Experiments address moral and social issues such as child safety, self-confidence, etc., producers of these social experiments might do it for their gain and benefits.

== Well-known social experiments ==
=== Bystander apathy (effect) ===
Based on the murder of Kitty Genovese outside her home, The New York Times stated that there were 38 witnesses who either saw or heard the fatal stabbing take place, and not a single person came to her aid. Although this number was proven to be exaggerated, this murder was coined "bystander apathy" by social psychologists Bibb Latané and John Darley in 1968.

For their experiment, Latané and Darley tried to replicate the Genovese slaying by having participants aware of each other but unable to communicate directly. Each participant was in a cubicle in contact with the other via a microphone; however, only one voice was allowed to speak at a time. A taped recording was played of a participant having an epileptic seizure. When the participant believed themselves to be alone they invariably attempted to find help. When the participant believed others were around the speed and frequency of response declined significantly. The authors concluded that situational factors play an influential role in bystander apathy. People are less likely to help in an emergency if other people are present. Two reasons were offered by Latané and Darley: first is the diffusion of responsibility, and second is pluralistic ignorance or the mentality that if nobody else is helping, then I am not needed as well.

Research on bystander apathy by psychologist Kyle Thomas et al. found that people's decisions to help are influenced by their level of knowledge. While the diffusion of responsibility and pluralistic ignorance are factors, the researchers found that bystanders also consider what they know about other bystanders and the situation before getting involved.

=== HighScope ===
The HighScope Perry Preschool Project was evaluated in a randomized controlled trial of 123 children (58 were randomly assigned to a treatment group that received the program and a control group of 65 children that did not receive the program). Prior to the program, the preschool and control groups were equivalent in measures of intellectual performance and demographic characteristics. After the program, the educational and life outcomes for the children receiving the program were much superior to the outcomes for the children not receiving the program. Many of the program effects were significant or approaching significance. At age 40, the participants were interviewed once more, and school, social services, and arrest records were pulled. The participants had higher-earning jobs, committed fewer crimes, and were more likely to hold a job than adults who did not attend preschool.

=== RAND Health Insurance Experiment ===
The RAND Health Insurance Experiment was an experimental study of health care costs, utilization, and outcomes in the United States which assigned people randomly to different kinds of plans and followed their behavior from 1974 to 1982. As a result, it provided stronger evidence than studies that examine people afterward who were not randomly assigned. It concluded that cost-sharing reduced "inappropriate or unnecessary" medical care (over-utilization), but also reduced "appropriate or needed" medical care. It did not have enough statistical power to tell whether people who got less appropriate or needed care were more likely to die as a result.

=== Oportunidades/Prospera/Progresa ===
Oportunidades is a government social assistance (welfare) program in Mexico founded in 2002, based on a previous program called Progresa created in 1997. It is designed to target poverty by providing cash payments to families in exchange for regular school attendance, health clinic visits, and nutrition support. Oportunidades is credited with decreasing poverty and improving health and educational attainment in regions where it has been deployed.

=== Moving to Opportunity ===
Moving to Opportunity for Fair Housing was a randomized social experiment sponsored by the United States Department of Housing and Urban Development in the 1990s among 4600 low-income families with children living in high-poverty public housing projects. The program was designed based on the assumption that households benefit from living in higher-opportunity neighborhoods. Early evaluations of the MTO program, however, showed minimal gains for participant families. One explanation for these findings is the short length of time that MTO families typically spent in lower-poverty neighborhoods; the positive effects of longer-term exposure to low-poverty neighborhoods appear more promising.

=== Stanford prison experiment ===
The Stanford prison experiment was a study of the psychological effects of becoming a prisoner or prison guard. The experiment was conducted at Stanford University on 14–20 August 1971, by a team of researchers led by psychology professor Philip Zimbardo using college students. It was funded by the U.S. Office of Naval Research and was of interest to both the U.S. Navy and Marine Corps as an investigation into the causes of conflict between military guards and prisoners. The experiment is a study on the psychology of imprisonment.

=== Experiments by Muzafer Sherif ===
Sherif was a founder of modern social psychology who developed several techniques for understanding social processes, particularly social norms, and social conflict. Sherif's experimental study of the auto-kinetic movement demonstrated how mental evaluation norms were created by human beings. Sherif is equally famous for the Robbers Cave Experiments. This series of experiments, begun in Connecticut and concluded in Oklahoma, took boys from intact middle-class families, who were carefully screened to be psychologically normal, delivered them to a summer camp setting (with researchers doubling as counselors), and created social groups that came into conflict with each other.

=== Bobo doll experiment ===
The Bobo doll experiment was a study carried out by Albert Bandura who was a professor at Stanford University. It focused on the study of aggression using three groups of preschoolers as the subjects. Bandura took inflatable plastic toys called Bobo dolls and weighted them down to always stand upright. The preschoolers were divided into three groups by gender, and then into six subgroups. One of the groups would observe an adult act aggressively towards the Bobo doll, another group would observe an adult with non-aggressive behaviors, and the last group would not be exposed to any behavior models. The study found the preschoolers exposed to aggressive behavior had imitated aggressiveness towards the doll, regardless of gender. The other two groups showed significantly less hostility towards the doll. The study had shown aggressive and non-aggressive behaviors were learned by observing others and had a significant effect on the subjects even after the study was concluded.

=== Stanford marshmallow experiment ===
The Stanford marshmallow experiment was a study conducted by psychologist Walter Mischel on delayed gratification in the early 1970s. During the three studies, a child was offered a choice between one small reward provided immediately or two small rewards if they waited for a short period, approximately 15 minutes, during which the tester left the room and then returned. (The reward was sometimes a marshmallow, but often a cookie or a pretzel.) In follow-up studies, the researchers found that children who were able to wait longer for the preferred rewards tended to have better life outcomes, as measured by SAT scores, educational attainment, body mass index (BMI), and other life measures.

=== Asch conformity experiment ===
The Asch experiment took place at Swarthmore College in 1951. Solomon Asch conducted an experiment to investigate the extent to which social pressure from a majority group could affect a person to conform. Asch took 50 people from the college to participate in a vision test. They were paired up with 7 other people who they believed to be random, but instead were part of a control group who would choose the same answers. The real participant would give his or her answers last. Out of the 18 trials, the group gave the wrong answers 12 times. 75% of the participants conformed once or more, and the remaining 25% never conformed to the group's wrong answers. Participants were interviewed after the experiment, and although they knew the answers were wrong, they conformed to not be ridiculed by the group. A few individuals said they thought the group's answers were correct. Asch concluded that people conformed because they either wanted to fit in or thought the group was right.

=== Hawthorne experiment ===
The Hawthorne experiment took place in 1924 in the city of Chicago. Elton Mayo is widely known as the person behind the project. However, his involvement started in 1928 after he was invited by George Pennock, the assistant works manager for the Hawthorne plant of Western Electric. During the experiment, workers were separated into two groups to study the effects of different incentives on their productivity. Different variations were tested, such as changing the light levels in the rooms. Other, more obvious incentives, such as monetary incentives and rest pauses, were also tested and seemed to show positive results. Several conclusions were made after the experiments finished:

- When employees had more freedom to choose their own conditions and output standards, their productivity increased;
- Social interaction played an important role in the creation of a high level of group cohesion;
- People tend to put more effort when they feel their worth and cooperate with each other.

=== Halo effect ===
The halo effect was first developed and empirically examined by an American psychologist named Edward Thorndike in his 1920 piece "A Constant Error in Psychological Ratings". The halo effect, also called the halo error, refers to a type of cognitive bias in which we perceive people as better due to their other related traits.

A typical halo effect example is the attractiveness stereotype, which refers to ascribing positive qualities to physically attractive people. Often, attractive individuals are believed to have lower mortality rates, better mental health, and higher intelligence. However, this is a cognitive error based on one's inclinations, beliefs, and social perception. The halo effect is a well-documented social psychology discovery. It is the concept that a person's overall evaluations (e.g., she is pleasant) bleed over into judgments regarding their characteristics (e.g. she is intelligent). It's also known as the "beauty is good" notion or the "physical attractiveness" stereotype.

=== Milgram Experiment ===
The Milgram experiment, conducted by psychologist Stanley Milgram in the early 1960s, aimed to investigate obedience to authority figures. It involved three roles: the experimenter (the authority figure), the teacher (the participant), and the learner (an actor posing as a participant). The teacher was instructed to administer electric shocks to the learner for wrong answers, despite the learner's apparent distress. This experiment shed light on individuals' willingness to comply with authority, even when it contradicted their personal beliefs.

The findings of the experiment revealed that a significant portion of participants continued to administer shocks despite their discomfort, showcasing the power of authority in influencing human behavior.

The Milgram experiment's ethical considerations and criticism centered on its psychological impact on participants. It raised concerns about the potential emotional stress inflicted on the individuals involved in the study.

This study significantly contributed to understanding obedience to authority and human behavior in social contexts. Its impact extended beyond psychology, influencing various fields like ethics, sociology, and behavioral studies. The experiment's implications and ethical considerations continue to spark discussions in the academic and social spheres.

== Informal social experiments ==
=== The Button ===
The Button was an online social experiment on the social networking website Reddit created by Josh Wardle, who went by powerlanguage, on 1 April 2015 (April Fools' Day) as an April Fools' prank. The experiment involved an online button and a 60-second countdown timer that would reset every time the button was pressed. Reddit users who created their account before 1 April had only one chance to press the button.

During the experiment, Reddit users would split by colored circles based on when they pressed the button. If the button was pushed with 60 seconds on the timer, their circle would be purple, if it was pushed with 45 seconds, their circle would be blue, etc. If the user did not press the button, their circle would stay grey. These color-coded circles turned into factions as people of the same colored circles would come together and create their own subreddits, with the purple group being the largest group.

This experiment went on for two months until 5 June 2015, when the timer went down to zero. A Reddit user named mncke created an automated bot that would use “zombie” accounts to press the Button so the Button would go on forever. But when one of the “zombie's” accounts was created after 1 April, nothing happened when it tried to press the Button, and the Button ticked down to zero.

=== r/Place ===
r/Place was an online social experiment on the social networking website Reddit created by Josh Wardle, who went by powerlanguage, that first began on April Fools' Day 2017 and rebooted on April Fools' Day 2022. In the 2017 experiment, it started off as a blank 1000x1000 tile canvas with tiny white pixels, and Reddit users can place a colored tile once every five minutes. There were different types of artwork such as the Mona Lisa, band logos, video game logos, and multiple country flags, with the American flag being in the center. The experiment ended after 3 days with 16 million pixels and over a million users who edited the canvas.

In the 2022 experiment, it started off with a blank 2000x2000 tile canvas and 16 new colors. There were turf wars during the experiment where people would change the logos, such as changing the Genshin Impact logo to read “Genshit.” The experiment ended after five days with nearly 72 million pixels and over 6 million users who edited the canvas.
