= Don Foresta =

Don Foresta (born 1938 in Buffalo, NY, USA) is a research artist and theoretician in art. He has pioneered the use of new technologies as creative tools, with recent attention to online creation and archiving. His work Mondes Multiples, published in French in 1990, is recognized as a landmark in the fields of art and science and art and technology. A graduate of the University of Buffalo, the Johns Hopkins School of Advanced International Studies, Foresta also holds a doctorate degree from the Sorbonne in Information Science. He is a dual citizen of the US and France and was named "Chevalier" of the Order of Arts and Lettres by the French Ministry of Culture.

Foresta has contributed to many publications on the subject of the interface between art and science and philosophical parallels between the two in a period of profound change. He has been a Visiting Research Associate at the London School of Economics and is a retired professor of the École nationale supérieure des arts décoratifs in Paris and the Ecole Nationale Supérieure d'Arts – Paris/Cergy.

Foresta was the director of the American Cultural Center in Paris from 1971 to 1976. In 1976, he created the video art department of ENSAD (École nationale supérieure des arts décoratifs) in Paris, the first such department in Europe. In 1981, Foresta organized his first online image exchange by telephone between the Center for Advanced Visual Studies at MIT where he was a fellow and the American Center in Paris where he was director of the Media Art program. He was a commissioner to the 42nd Venice Biennial in 1986, building one of the first computer networks between artists. He has continued to work with the evolving network technology for over 40 years, now through the permanent network, MARCEL created on 2001.

== MARCEL ==
Foresta coordinates the permanent high band-width network for artistic, educational and cultural experimentation, MARCEL, a homage to Marcel Duchamp, begun in 1996 when he stopped doing online events to concentrate on the permanent network MARCEL, inaugurated in 2001 with a connection between London and Toronto. The development began seriously while Foresta was an invited artist/professor in residence at the National Studio of Contemporary Art, Le Fresnoy, Lille, France and continues with a growing list of active partners. MARCEL is ongoing but the basic structure was completed and launched under a three-year UK Arts & Humanities Research Council fellowship at the Wimbledon School of Art in London. After recognising that industry would never provide the necessary tools for art on line, he began preparing a programme for developing what became known as mmmap, MARCEL Multi-Media Art Platform developed by Benoît Lahoz and inaugurated in January, 2023 with partners principally in France while expanding to other countries. MARCEL continues to grow and now has 250 confirmed members in 22 countries. many permanently connected over our multicasting platform. The MARCEL web site can be found at mmmarcel.org which features an archive of work listed under MARCEL TV.
