= Josh Wardle =

Welsh game developer

- Born: 1982 or 1983 (age 43–44)
- Education: Royal Holloway, University of London; University of Oregon (MFA)
- Occupations: Software engineer, artist, product manager
- Known for: Wordle, r/place
- Website: powerlanguage.co.uk

Josh Wardle (born 1982 or 1983) is a Welsh software engineer best known for developing the viral web-based word game Wordle and the collaborative experimental project r/place for Reddit. In January 2022, the New York Times Company acquired Wordle from Wardle for a seven-figure sum. He lives in Brooklyn, New York City. Wardle was named one of Time's 100 Most Influential People of the year in 2022.

== Early life and education ==
Wardle is from South Wales, and he was brought up on an organic livestock farm in Llanddewi Rhydderch near Abergavenny.

He attended university at Royal Holloway, University of London, and earned a degree in Media Arts. A few years later, he moved to the United States to attend the University of Oregon, where he graduated with a Master of Fine Arts in Digital Art.

He has two brothers, one of whom is documentary filmmaker Tim Wardle, director of the 2018 film Three Identical Strangers.

== Career ==
=== Reddit and Pinterest ===
After completing graduate school, Wardle moved to Oakland, California, and began working as an artist at Reddit in 2011. He later became one of Reddit's first product managers and served in this position on the community engineering team. As a community engineering product manager, he created popular collaborative experimental projects such as The Button in 2015 and r/place in 2017.

He left Reddit for almost two years to work as a software engineer at Pinterest, before returning to Reddit also as a software engineer.

=== Wordle ===
In 2013, Wardle made a prototype of the word game Wordle, a play on his last name. Wardle's initial name for the game was Mr. Bugs' Wordy Nugz.

In January 2021, he returned to his 2013 prototype to create a word game for his partner, Palak Shah. During the COVID-19 pandemic, he and Shah had played many New York Times games including Spelling Bee, and he wanted to make a new word game that they could play together. Shah played a vital role in the game's development before it went public. She reviewed the 12,000 five-letter words in the English language and narrowed them down to 2,500 commonly-known words that could be used in the daily puzzle.

From January to June 2021, Wardle and Shah played the game in secret. First, Wardle shared the game with his family members before posting it on his website and making it widely available in October 2021. The game had 90 players by 1 November 2021, within a month of Wardle making it public. One month later the game had 300,000 daily players, which rose to two million by the following week. Wordle had no advertisements and Wardle's goal was not to make money. Despite Wordle's success, Wardle did not want operating the game to become his full-time job.

In January 2022, The New York Times Company announced that it had acquired Wordle "for an undisclosed price in the low-seven figures."

=== After Wordle ===
From December 2021 to May 2023, Wardle worked as a software engineer at Brooklyn-based art collective MSCHF. Since May 2023, Wardle has worked as a freelance creative consultant and game designer through his company Powerlanguage. In July 2024, he gave a presentation at the Figma Config conference that introduced him as an artist and software engineer at Gremco Industries.

In 2026, Wardle released a new game called Parseword based on cryptic crosswords. He described the game as a "gradual on-ramp" for those new to them.
