= Invicta Plastics =

Invicta Plastics Ltd.
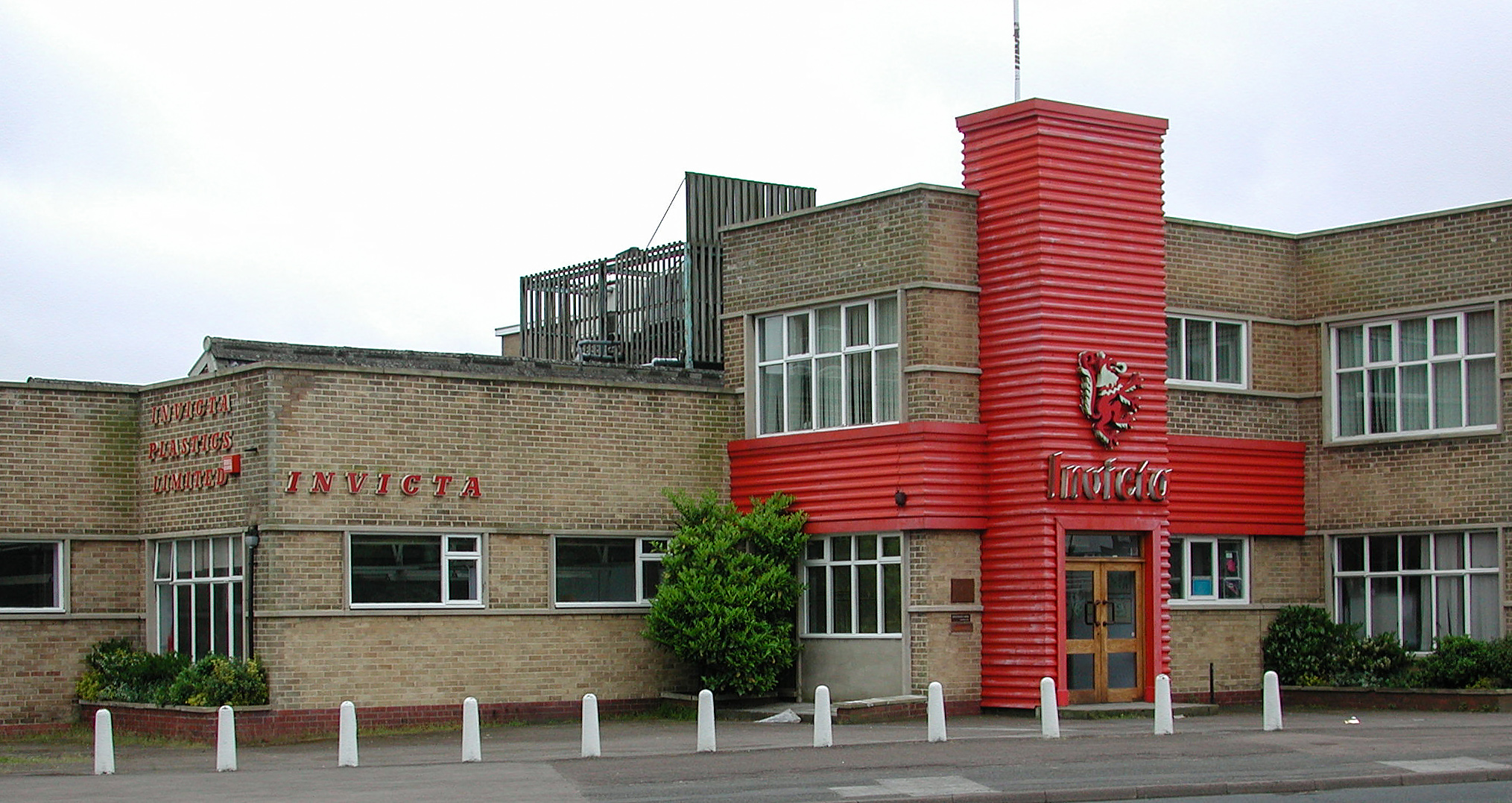
- The Oadby Headquarters in 2001
- Industry: Manufacturing
- Founded: 1946; 80 years ago
- Defunct: 2013
- Fate: Liquidation
- Successor: Make a Material Difference Ltd.
- Headquarters: Queen's Road, Leicester; Oadby, Leicestershire (demolished 2009); Scudamore Rd., Leicester (2009-2013)
- Key people: Lady Onslow (Chief Executive); Edward Jones-Fenleigh (Founder)
- Products: Toys; Mastermind (board game); Games; Plastic dinosaurs; Other plastic goods
- Number of employees: 35 (2013)

Invicta Plastics Ltd. was a plastics manufacturing company, founded in 1946 by Edward Jones-Fenleigh (Incorporated as a PLC in 1951, previously Invicta Industries). They had a headquarters in Oadby in Leicestershire until 2009, when they moved to Scudamore Road, Leicester, where they remained until their insolvency in 2013. They were particularly known for their production of the Mastermind board game. They were also responsible for the manufacture of ‘Red Noses’ for Comic Relief in the 1980s and 1990s.

== History ==
The company was founded by Edward J. Jones-Fenleigh in 1946, and was incorporated as a limited company in 1951. In the early years of the company, their services included injection moulding, thermoplastic sheet moulding and vacuum forming. In 1951, the company moved to their Oadby headquarters, where it remained until 2009. During this period, their customers included Coca-Cola, Unilever and Reckitt Benckiser. The site was demolished, and a Waitrose was built in the location, opening in 2010. In 2013 the company went into a management buyout under Shelley Jones-Fenleigh, with the new company Make a Material Difference Ltd. procuring several divisions of Invicta Plastics Ltd.

== Notable products ==
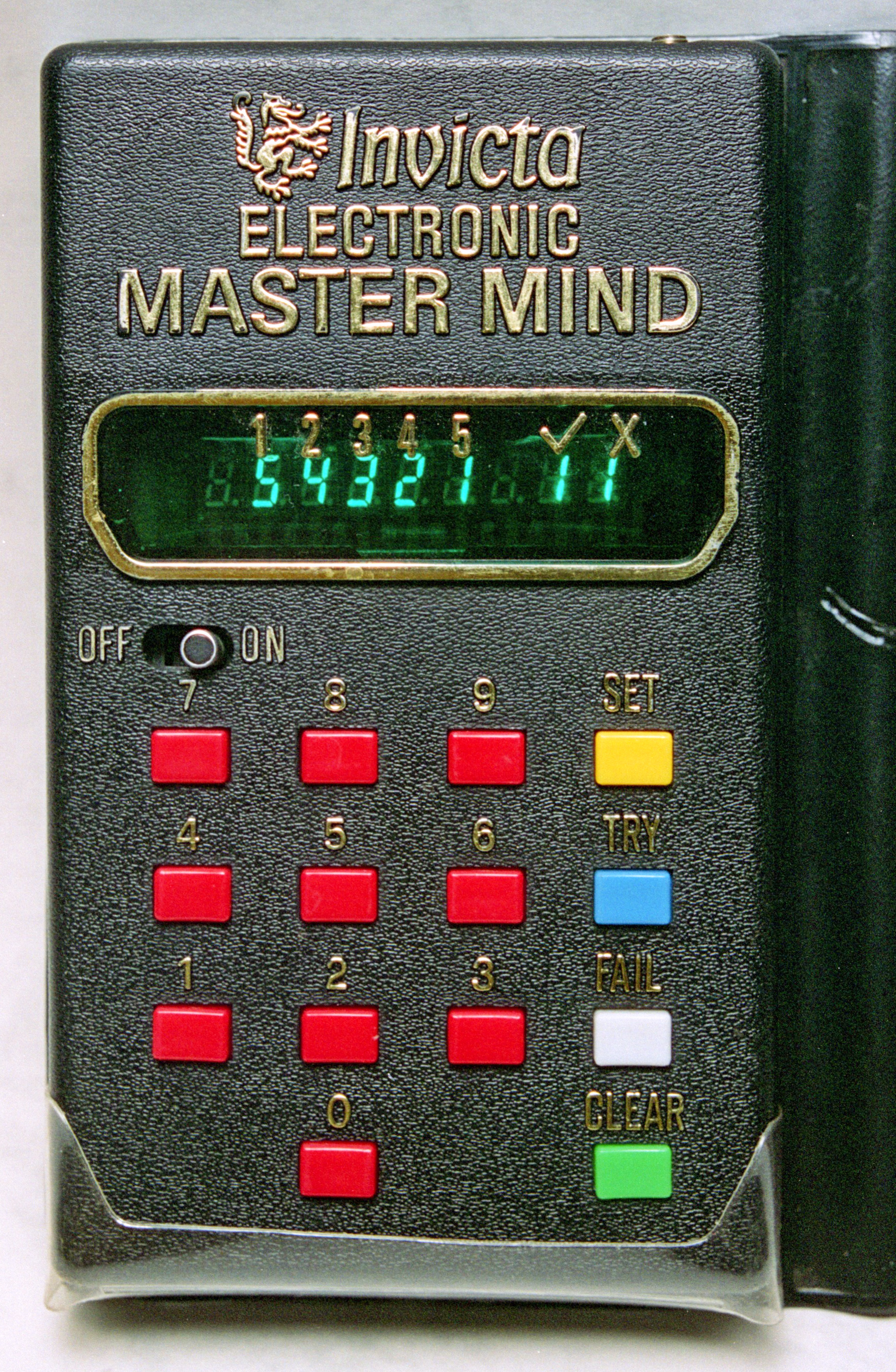
Invicta Electronic Master Mind game

Mastermind (or Master Mind), is a code-breaking board game for two players launched in 1971. It was one of the more prominent products of the company, with reported sales in the millions. The success of the game led to them winning the Queen’s Award for Export in 1978. They also made a handheld electronic device based on the game.

Invicta Plastics also produced a line of plastic dinosaurs in conjunction with the Natural History Museum from 1974.

The company manufactured the Comic Relief ‘Red Noses’ for a number of years in the 1980s and 1990s. Of particular note, in 1995, they produced heat-responsive colour-changing noses.
