= Any-source multicast =

Delivering multicast packets based only on destination address

Any-source multicast (ASM) is the older and more usual form of multicast where multiple senders can be on the same group/channel, as opposed to source-specific multicast where a single particular source is specified.

Any-source multicast allows a host computer to map IPs and then sends IPs to a number of groups via IP address. This method of multicasting allows hosts to transmit to/from groups without any restriction on the location of end-user computers by allowing any receiving host group computer to become a transmission source. Bandwidth usage is nominal allowing Video Conferencing to be used extensively. However, this type of multicast is vulnerable in that it allows for unauthorized traffic and denial-of-service attacks.

Commonly, any-source multicast is used in IGMP version 2; however, it can also be used in PIM-SM, MSDP, and MBGP. ASM utilizes IPv4 in association with the previously stated protocols; in addition, MLDv1 protocol is used for IPv6 addresses.

== Benefits ==
- Scalability for large tasks
- The reduction of group management
- Ability to use existing technologies

== See also ==
- IP multicast
- Internet Group Management Protocol
- RTCP
- Xcast
