= Multicast Routing Daemon v6 =

The Multicast Routing Daemon v6 (MRD6) is an IPv6 multicast routing daemon developed by Hugo Santos. Its main features include:

- Extensible modular design
- MLDv1 and MLDv2 support
- PIM-SM support (ASM and SSM)
- Partial MBGP support
- Supports both native and virtual (tunnel) interfaces (tested IPv6-IPv4, IPv6-IPv6 and TUN/TAP tunnels)
- Abstract Multicast Forwarding Interface (MFA) with user-space forwarding
- CLI support (remote configuration and management) via telnet or local access

The project is unsupported since 2013. The author states as a reason that native multicast forwarding support is available in Linux since 2005 and pim6sd could be used to manage it.

== See also ==
- IP Multicast
