= NACK-Oriented Reliable Multicast =

Principal protocol used to stream data across an IP network

NACK-Oriented Reliable Multicast (NORM) is a transport layer Internet protocol designed to provide reliable transport in multicast groups in data networks. It is formally defined by the Internet Engineering Task Force (IETF) in Request for Comments (RFC) 5740, which was published in November 2009.

NORM operates on top of the User Datagram Protocol (UDP), and ensures reliable communication based upon a negative acknowledgement (NACK), selective Automatic Repeat Request (ARQ) mechanism, as opposed to the positive acknowledgement (ACK) approach that the standard Transmission Control Protocol (TCP) uses. In other words, receivers using NORM only send feedback when they do not receive a packet, as opposed to the TCP model where receivers regularly acknowledge packet receipt as part of it protocol operation. This allows NORM to support large-scale receiver groups.

To support further scalability, NORM also employs packet erasure coding using forward error correction (FEC) codes coupled with suppression of redundant NACK feedback from the receiver group. Additionally, NORM can be configured to operate with “silent receivers” relying upon its packet erasure coding for high assurance delivery, thus operating as a broadcast-only protocol. The FEC can be configured to be used either reactively (with NACKing receivers) or proactively (silent receivers), or in a hybrid manner that allows tradeoffs in latency and network overhead.

Along with supporting reliable transport, NORM also provides TCP-compatible congestion control as well as end-to-end flow control. Unlike TCP, which uses the ACK mechanism for congestion control and flow control, NORM uses separate mechanisms for each. This allows for a wide variety of configurations to meet different application data delivery needs.

NORM also supports additional signaling mechanisms to facilitate session control, application-controlled positive acknowledgement, and other functions towards building complete point-to-point and group network communications applications that are highly robust and efficient.

Although NORM was developed primarily to support multicast group communication, it also supports unicast (point-to-point) data transfers.

== Background ==
In the TCP/IP network model, the transport layer of the network (Layer 4) is responsible for the reliable transport of data. The TCP protocol is the principal means of ensuring reliable unicast (point-to-point) transport. TCP does this through an ACK mechanism.

With the ACK mechanism, data packets are sequentially numbered, and the sender does not send a packet in a sequence until it receives an acknowledgement (ACK) from the receiver that the previous packet has been successfully received. If the sender does not receive an ACK after a specified time period, it resends the associated packet. The sender will continue doing this until it receives an ACK (although beyond a certain point the sender will assume the connection has been lost and stop the session). This is loosely analogous to a human listener nodding his or her head and saying "uh-huh" in a one-on-one conversation between persons. (TCP's sister protocol, UDP, does not do this. UDP simply sends data packets over the network in a best effort manner and assumes the packets are well received.)

An early problem noted with TCP's ACK mechanism was it did not work well in large multicast group communications. In multicast group communications, data packets are transmitted to a group of receivers simultaneously. In large multicast groups, the use of ACKs can create “ACK implosions,” in which a large number of simultaneous ACKs can overwhelm the sender. This is loosely analogous to a large roomful of human listeners nodding their heads and saying "uh-huh" while a speaker is talking.

The Multicast Dissemination Protocol (MDP) was an initial attempt to ensure reliability and to address the problem of ACK implosions through the use of NACKs. MDP used selective negative acknowledgement (NACK) to support reliability. Additionally, MDP implemented probabilistic techniques to suppress redundant NACKs in the multicast group (and thereby avoid NACK implosions).

MDP also used packet-level forward error correction coding concepts as a repair mechanism. Encoded parity repair packets were generally sent in response to repair requests by receivers. In this way no additional protocol overhead was added above selective retransmission methods. Additionally, MDP allowed the protocol to be optionally configured to send proactive repair packets in the original data transmission block.

MDP was a direct predecessor to NORM, with an initial IETF draft published in November 1996. The National Aeronautics and Space Administration (NASA) adopted MDP for reliable file transfers during space missions., and the U.S. Army used in for tactical group messaging in its Force Battle Command Brigade and Below (FBCB2) system.

Several other approaches to reliable multicast were being developed at approximately the same time, and in April 1999, the IETF chartered the Reliable Multicast Transport Working Group (RMTWG) to standardize reliable multicast transport.

The RMTWG pursued the strategy of developing building blocks and protocol instantiations. This strategy avoided a "one size fits all" protocol, which in turn could accommodate the large number of applications and types of applications that reliable multicast could support.

Building blocks were defined as “a set of easily-separable coarse-grained modular components that are common to multiple protocols along with abstract APIs that define a building block's access methods and their arguments.” Initial building blocks included negative acknowledgments, forward error correction, a generic signaling mechanism for router assist, and transport protection

Protocol instantiations were defined as “specifications that define the necessary gluing logic and minimal additional functionality required to realize a working protocol from one or more building blocks.” Those specifications would also include an abstract API that defined the interface between the protocol implementation and an application. Two protocol instantiations were chosen:

- A NACK-based protocol
- An Asynchronous Layered Coding protocol

In July 2005 the NACK-based protocol building blocks and protocol instantiation were submitted as “Experimental” in RFC 3940, and in November 2009 “NACK-Oriented Reliable Multicast (NORM) Transport Protocol” was approved in RFC 5740.

The RMTWG was disestablished in September 2013.

== NORM architectural constructs ==
The following architectural constructs are defined in RFC 5740 Section 2, Architecture Definition.

The NORM message is the fundamental NORM architectural construct. A NORM message is contained in the data field of a UDP datagram.

A NORM object refers to one of the three different types of bulk data carried in a NORM message:

- NORM_OBJECT_DATA
- NORM_OBJECT_FILE
- NORM_OBJECT_STREAM

NORM_OBJECT_DATA refers to static computer memory data content, while NORM_OBJECT_FILE refers to computer storage files. Both message types provide reliable transport to finite blocks of content, but a distinction is made to allow receivers to determine what type of storage to allocate for the content of received messages.

The NORM_OBJECT_STREAM refers to streams (non-finite) of continuous data content. NORM supports reliable transport of streaming data similar to that of TCP, with an exception being that NORM receivers are able to join in the reception of stream content without regard for the point of time in the stream.

A NORM session refers to the exchange of information among two or more network hosts using NORM. Typically a NORM session takes place using pre-determined IP addresses and port numbers, which are usually associated with IP multicast group addresses that are determined prior to the session. These addresses may be determined using other protocols, such as the Session Description Protocol (SDP) [RFC 4566] or the Session Announcement Protocol (SAP) [RFC 2974]. Although NORM was specifically designed for multicast group communication, it supports unicast communication, also.

A fundamental assumption about a NORM session is that it will consist of a single transmitter communicating with a group of receivers. Multiple senders may operate in a given NORM session, although each receiver must maintain state for each sender.

A NORM node refers to an individual node taking part in a NORM session. Each node has a unique identifier. When a node transmits a NORM message, this identifier is noted as the source_id.

A NORM instance refers to an individual node in the context of a continuous segment of a NORM session. When a node joins a NORM session, it has a unique node identification as well as an instance identification. If the node leaves the session for any reason, and later rejoins the session, the node identification remains the same, but the instance identification changes. The current instance is noted as the instance_id.

== NORM message structure ==
NORM has two general message classes, sender and receiver messages, that are defined in RFC 5740 Section 4, NORM Message Formats. NORM sender message types are: NORM_DATA, NORM_INFO, and NORM_CMD. NORM receiver message types are: NORM_NACK, NORM_ACK, and NORM_REPORT.

All NORM messages consist of a mandatory common header, a message type header, and a payload (data) section. An optional extension field that specifies the error correction encoding being used, the congestion control algorithm, or other session management information, can be inserted between the header and payload sections.

Generic NORM Message Structure
0								1								2								3							
0	1	2	3	4	5	6	7	0	1	2	3	4	5	6	7	0	1	2	3	4	5	6	7	0	1	2	3	4	5	6	7
Common Message Header
Message Type Header
Optional Header Extensions
Payload

=== NORM Common Message Header ===
All NORM messages begin with the following common header, defined in RFC 5740, Section 4.1, NORM Common Message Header and Extension.

0								1								2								3							
0	1	2	3	4	5	6	7	0	1	2	3	4	5	6	7	0	1	2	3	4	5	6	7	0	1	2	3	4	5	6	7
version				type				hdr_len								sequence															
source_id

version (4 bits)
The protocol version number.
type (4 bits)
The NORM message type (i.e., 1 = NORM_INFO, 2 = NORM_DATA, 3 = NORM_CMD, 4 = NORM_NACK, 5 = NORM_ACK, 6 = NORM_REPORT).
hdr_len (8 bits)
The number of 32-bit words that constitute the given message's header portion. This is used to identify the addition of header extensions. If the "hdr_len" value is greater than the base value for the given message type, it implies the presence of a header extension.
sequence (16 bits)
Serves two purposes (depending on the message type):
- Allows receivers to maintain an estimate of packet loss to facilitate congestion control
- Supports protection from message replay attacks of NORM_NACK or NORM_NACK messages.
source_id (32 bits)
The unique identify of the node that originated the message within the context of a given NORM session.

=== NORM_DATA Message Type ===
The NORM_DATA message, defined in RFC 5740 Section 4.2.1, is the most common message type transmitted by NORM senders. NORM_DATA messages carry segmented data content for NORM_OBJECT_DATA, NORM_OBJECT_FILE, and NORM_OBJECT_STREAM types.

0								1								2								3							
0	1	2	3	4	5	6	7	0	1	2	3	4	5	6	7	0	1	2	3	4	5	6	7	0	1	2	3	4	5	6	7
version				type				hdr_len								sequence															
source_id
instance_id																grtt								backoff				gsize			
flags								fec_id								object_transport_id															
fed_payload_id
header_extensions (if applicable)
payload_length (see Note 1)																payload_msg_start (see Note 1)															
payload_offset (see Note 1)
payload_data

instance_id (16 bits)
A unique identification of the current instance of participation in the NORM session.
grtt (8 bits)
The sender's current estimate of group round-trip time.
backoff (4 bits)
A value used by receivers to determine the maximum backoff timer value when using timer-based NORM NACK feedback suppression mechanisms.
gsize (4 bits)
The sender's current estimate of group size.
flags (32 bits)
Binary flags providing information to assist the receiver in appropriately handling the payload.
fec_id
The FEC Encoding Identifier. This is described in the FEC Building Block document [RFC5052].
object_transport_id
A value assigned by the sender to NORM objects being transmitted that receivers use for transmissions and repair requests. It is increased in a monotonically incremental manner.
fec_payload_id
An identifier for the attached NORM_DATA payload content.
Note 1
payload_length, payload_msg, and payload_offset only pertain to NORM_OBJECT_STREAM content.

=== NORM_INFO Message Type ===
NORM_INFO messages, defined in RFC 5740 Section 4.2.2, allow optional, out-of-band data to be sent in association with the data content objects. This allows receivers to determine the nature of the corresponding content being transmitted, which in turn allows application-level control of the receiver node's participation in the session.

The NORM_INFO content must fit into the payload portion of a single NORM message. Thus, it is considered atomic. An example of NORM_INFO use would be to send MIME-type information for the associated NORM data content. This would allow receivers to make decisions about their participation in the session.

0								1								2								3							
0	1	2	3	4	5	6	7	0	1	2	3	4	5	6	7	0	1	2	3	4	5	6	7	0	1	2	3	4	5	6	7
version				type				hdr_len								sequence															
source_id
instance_id																grtt								backoff				gsize			
flags								fec_id								object_transport_id															
header_extensions (if applicable)
payload_data...

instance_id (16 bits)
A unique identification of the current instance of participation in the NORM session.
grtt (8 bits)
The sender's current estimate of group round-trip time.
backoff (4 bits)
A value used by receivers to determine the maximum backoff timer value when using timer-based NORM NACK feedback suppression mechanisms.
gsize (4 bits)
The sender's current estimate of group size.
flags (32 bits)
Binary flags providing information to assist the receiver in appropriately handling the payload.
fec_id
The FEC Encoding Identifier. This is described in the FEC Building Block document [RFC5052].
object_transport_id
A value assigned by the sender to NORM objects being transmitted that receivers use for transmissions and repair requests. It is increased in a monotonically incremental manner.

=== NORM_CMD Message Type ===
NORM_CMD messages, defined in RFC 5740 Section 4.2.3, are used to manage NORM sessions. These messages serve to collect round-trip timing, gather and send data related to congestion control, synchronize repair windows, and make notifications of a sender's status. There is a core set of specified and enumerated NORM_CMD messages, as well as a range other available types for application-specific use.

0								1								2								3							
0	1	2	3	4	5	6	7	0	1	2	3	4	5	6	7	0	1	2	3	4	5	6	7	0	1	2	3	4	5	6	7
version				type				hdr_len								sequence															
source_id
instance_id																grtt								backof				gsize			
flags								fec_id								object_transport_id															
sub-type								NORM_CMD Content																							
NORM_CMD Content...

instance_id (16 bits)
A unique identification of the current instance of participation in the NORM session.
grtt (8 bits)
The sender's current estimate of group round-trip time.
backoff (4 bits)
A value used by receivers to determine the maximum backoff timer value when using timer-based NORM NACK feedback suppression mechanisms.
gsize (4 bits)
The sender's current estimate of group size.
flags (32 bits)
Binary flags providing information to assist the receiver in appropriately handling the payload.
fec_id
The FEC Encoding Identifier. This is described in the FEC Building Block document [RFC5052].
object_transport_id
A value assigned by the sender to NormObjects being transmitted that receivers use for transmissions and repair requests. It is increased in a monotonically incremental manner.
sub_type (8 bits)
Indicates the type of command that follows.
NORM_CMD content

- FLUSH : Indicates sender's temporary end-of-transmission. May also be optionally used to collect positive acknowledgment of reliable reception from a subset of receivers.
- EOT : Indicates permanent end of transmission.
- SQUELCH : Indicates current repair window of sender in response to out-of-range NACKs
- CC : Used for GRTT measurement and collection of congestion control feedback
- REPAIR_ADV : Advertises sender's aggregated repair/feedback state for suppression of unicast feedback from receivers.
- ACK_REQ : Requests application-defined positive acknowledgment from a list of receivers (OPTIONAL).
- APPLICATION : Used for application-defined purposes that need to temporarily preempt or supplement data transmission (OPTIONAL).

=== NORM_NACK Message Type ===
NORM_NACK messages, defined in RFC 5740 Section 4.3.1, are used primarily for receivers to request repairs of sender content. Additionally, these messages contain fields to provide information to the sender(s) related to round-trip timing collection and congestion control.

0								1								2								3							
0	1	2	3	4	5	6	7	0	1	2	3	4	5	6	7	0	1	2	3	4	5	6	7	0	1	2	3	4	5	6	7
version				type				hdr_len								sequence															
source_id
server_id
instance_id																reserved															
grtt_response_sec
grtt_response_usec
header_extensions (if applicable)
nack_payload...

server_id (32 bits)
The NORM sender to which the NORM_NACK message is destined.
instance_id (16 bits)
A unique identification of the current instance of participation in the NORM session.
reserved (16 bits)
For potential future NORM use
grtt_response_sec (32 bits)
An adjusted version of the timestamp from the most recently received NORM_CMD(CC) message for the indicated NORM sender.
grtt_response_usec (32 bits)
An adjusted version of the timestamp from the most recently received NORM_CMD(CC) message for the indicated NORM sender.
NACK_payload
The repair needs of the receiver with respect to the NORM sender indicated by the "server_id" field.

=== NORM_ACK Message Type ===
NORM_ACK messages, defined in RFC 5740 4.3.2, are used primarily to support congestion control operations and round-trip timing measurements.

0								1								2								3							
0	1	2	3	4	5	6	7	0	1	2	3	4	5	6	7	0	1	2	3	4	5	6	7	0	1	2	3	4	5	6	7
version				type				hdr_len								sequence															
source_id
server_id
instance_id																ack_type								ack_id							
grtt_response_sec
grtt_response_usec
header_extensions (if applicable)
ack_payload (if applicable)

server_id (32 bits)
The NORM sender to which the NORM_ACK message is destined.
instance_id (16 bits)
A unique identification of the current instance of participation in the NORM session.
ack_type (8 bits)
The nature of the NORM_ACK message. This directly corresponds to the "ack_type" field of the NORM_CMD(ACK_REQ) message to which this acknowledgment applies.
ack_id (8 bits)
A sequence number so the sender can verify a received NORM_ACK message actually applies to a current acknowledgment request. The "ack_id" field is not used in the case of the NORM_ACK(CC) and NORM_ACK(FLUSH) acknowledgment types.
grtt_response_sec (32 bits)
An adjusted version of the timestamp from the most recently received NORM_CMD(CC) message for the indicated NORM sender.
grtt_response_usec (32 bits)
An adjusted version of the timestamp from the most recently received NORM_CMD(CC) message for the indicated NORM sender.
ack_payload (if applicable)
The "ack_payload" format is a function of the "ack_type".

=== NORM_REPORT Message Type ===
The NORM_REPORT message, discussed in RFC 5740 Section 4.4.1, is an optional message. The format is currently undefined.

=== NORM Header Extensions ===
Optional header extensions, defined in RFC 5740 Section 4.1, follow the common header and the message-specific header, and they precede the payload (if there is one). Header extensions typically carry information related to baseline FEC, congestion control operations, and other session management information. There are two types of header extensions: variable-length and fixed-length.

Variable-Length Header Extension
0								1								2								3							
0	1	2	3	4	5	6	7	0	1	2	3	4	5	6	7	0	1	2	3	4	5	6	7	0	1	2	3	4	5	6	7
het ≤ 127								hel								Header Extension Content															
Header Extension Content...

het (8 bits)
The header extension type. For variable-length header extensions, a value between 0 and 127 (inclusive).
hel (8 bits)
The header extension length. Indicates the length of the entire header extension.
header extension content
Varies depending on the purpose.

Fixed-Length Header Extension
0								1								2								3							
0	1	2	3	4	5	6	7	0	1	2	3	4	5	6	7	0	1	2	3	4	5	6	7	0	1	2	3	4	5	6	7
het ≥ 128								reserved								Header Extension Content															

het (8 bits)
The header extension type. For fixed-length header extensions, a value between 128 and 255 (inclusive).
reserved (8 bits)
Reserved for future use.
header extension content (16 bits)
Varies depending on purpose.

== Protocol operation ==
=== General operations ===
The following general NORM protocol operation is described in RFC 5740 Section 5, Detailed Protocol Operation.

1. Following the establishment of a NORM session, a sender segments a NORM object into an ordinally-numbered sequence. These segments are transmitted as NORM_DATA messages. In addition to data content, NORM_DATA messages are labelled with unique identifiers and FEC identifiers. The sender may also send out-of-band NORM_INFO messages associated with the NORM_DATA content that allow receivers to determine the nature of the corresponding content, which in turn allows application-level control of the receiver node's participation in the session.

At the same time, the sender periodically transmits NORM_CMD(CC) messages as needed to collect feedback information necessary for congestion control and other session management activities.

2. When receivers detect missing content from a sender, they may attempt repair using FEC mechanisms. Barring successful repairs, the receivers will send NORM_NACK messages to the sender. Using the ordinally-numbered sequence information, the receivers specify missing content.

3. As the sender receives NACKs, it aggregates repair requests and sends appropriate repairs associated with the ordinally-numbered sequence information.

4. When the sender reaches the end of a collection of repair requests, it transmits a NORM_CMD(FLUSH) message, indicating the temporary end of transmission.

Within the context of general operations, NORM has specific mechanisms to address session control, congestion control, flow control, reliability, and NACK management.

=== Session Control ===
Although NORM is not a connection-oriented protocol, like TCP, it does have both connection-oriented and connection-less characteristics.

Unlike the connection-oriented TCP protocol, NORM does not establish a session with a setup mechanism (i.e., a three-way handshake). Rather, NORM uses predesignated port numbers and addresses that senders and receivers must know. This allows receivers to join ongoing NORM sessions, and it allows quick resumption of a session after a network outage.

At the same time, NORM senders and receivers maintain state to ensure reliable transfer, hence NORM is not totally connection-less.

A range of NORM_CMD message sub-types is reserved to support session control protocols that may be developed in the future.

=== Congestion Control ===
NORM uses a TCP-Friendly congestion control scheme that enables it to fairly share available bandwidth with TCP and other transport protocols. Specifically, NORM's congestion control scheme uses a rate control procedure, and it is an adaptation of the TCP-Friendly Multicast Congestion Control [TFMCC] Protocol Specification approach described in RFC4654. This approach has been demonstrated to work well with TCP and multicast data flows.

The TFMCC congestion control approach is an equation-based approach. Sender transmission rates rely on the collection of packet loss estimates and round trip times that are collected with NORM_CMD(CC) messages. This information identifies bottlenecks and adjusts the sender rate to accommodate them.

As with TCP, the NORM congestion control scheme assumes packet loss is due to buffer overflows, and the sender consequently backs off it transmission rate when packet loss reaches a specified level. This can lead to limitations in wireless networks, where packet loss is often due to bit errors or contention.

Because NORM's rate control mechanism is separate from its other components, e.g., reliability mechanism, flow control mechanism, it can be replaced with an alternative algorithm and appropriate header extensions.

=== Flow Control ===
NORM has four options for flow control, which allows the NORM sender to manage the rate of transmission to NORM receivers to ensure the receivers are not overwhelmed.

1. Explicit watermark. With this option the sender requests positive acknowledgement from a specific set of receivers regarding the successful reception of a designated point, or watermark, in the current transmission. If all the receivers acknowledge successful receipt of the watermark, the sender can continue sending new data.

2. Implicit watermark. This option is based on a lack of negative acknowledgement (NACK) repair requests from the receiver set. The sender uses the NORM_CMD(FLUSH) to alert receivers to NACK for any repairs needed through the indicated watermark. The sender then waits until the flushing has fully completed. If there was no NACK activity, the sender assumes the “watermark” completed and can continue sending new data.

3. Soft, timer-based flow control. This option holds transmit data and limits repair window advancement based on group round-trip timing (GRTT) and NACK activity. A minimum, adaptable time limit is set, after which the sender can continue sending new data. This time limit is based on the sender-estimated GRTT and lack of NACK activity.

4. Purposeful disabling. This option deliberately disables flow control mechanisms and allows the application to push transmission forward with newly enqueued data in a best effort manner.

=== Reliability ===
NORM ensures reliable transport through the use of two forward error correction coding schemes: systematic codes and non-systematic codes. These are discussed in RFC 5740 Section 2, Architecture Definition:

With systematic codes, the sender transmits blocks of content followed by blocks of FEC.

With non-systematic codes, the sender encodes the content with FEC prior to transmission.

Both FEC coding schemes can be used in either a reactive or proactive manner. In both cases, FEC-based repair can be affected, which allows receivers to repair packets and thereby reduces the level of repair requests and repair transmissions.

=== Scalability and NACK management ===
NACK-oriented multicast communications are susceptible to NACK implosions. If a large number of receivers NACK simultaneously, this could overwhelm the sender as well as the entire network. NORM uses a NACK suppression mechanism, discussed in RFC 5740, Section 5.3, Receiver NACK Procedure, to prevent NACK implosions.

When a receiver detects it is missing data from a sender's NORM transmissions, it initiates its NACK procedure:

- There is an assumption that one or more other receivers have missed that same data, and that a NACK may have already been sent to the sender.
- The receiver enters a holdoff period based on a random backoff algorithm. The duration of this timeout is governed by the "RandomBackoff" algorithm described in the Multicast NACK Building Block [RFC5401], and is based on the information the sender has been transmitting in the "grtt", "backoff", and "gsize" fields of its transmitted messages.
- During the holdoff period the receiver continues to receive and evaluate repair messages from the sender, and it suppresses its own NACK.
- If, at the end of the holdoff period, the receiver has not received sufficient repair information, it initiates its NACK.
- If the NORM session is taking place in a multicast routing environment, the NACK is transmitted to the sender as well as all the other nodes in the network.
- If the NORM session is not taking place in a multicast routing environment, the NACK is transmitted to the sender, and the sender immediately re-sends it to all the other nodes in the network.

NORM's NACK suppression mechanism, combined with its FEC mechanism, allows NORM multicast groups to scale to very large group sizes while maintaining reliability.

== Reference Implementation ==
The United States Naval Research Laboratory maintains a freely-available, reference implementation of the NORM protocol on GitHub. This includes source code, a developer's guide, and a user's guide.

== Normative RFC documents ==
- RFC 1112 - Host Extensions for IP Multicasting, August 1989
- RFC 2357 - IETF Criteria for Evaluating Reliable Multicast Transport and Application Protocols, June 1998
- RFC 2974 - Session Announcement Protocol, October 2000
- RFC 3048 - Reliable Multicast Transport Building Blocks for One-to-Many Bulk-Data Transfer, January 2001
- RFC 3269 - Author Guidelines for Reliable Multicast Transport (RMT) Building Blocks and Protocol Instantiation documents, April 2002
- RFC 3453 - The Use of Forward Error Correction (FEC) in Reliable Multicast, December 2002
- RFC 3547 - The Group Domain of Interpretation, July 2003
- RFC 3550 - RTP: A Transport Protocol for Real-Time Applications, July 2003
- RFC 3830 - MIKEY: Multimedia Internet KEYing, August 2004
- RFC 3940 – Negative-acknowledgment (NACK)-Oriented Reliable Multicast (NORM) Protocol, November 2004
- RFC 4301 - Security Architecture for the Internet Protocol, December 2005
- RFC 4303 - IP Encapsulating Security Payload (ESP), December 2005
- RFC 4535 - GSAKMP: Group Secure Association Key Management Protocol, June 2006
- RFC 4566 - SDP: Session Description Protocol, July 2006
- RFC 4607 - Source-Specific Multicast for IP, August 2006
- RFC 4654 - TCP-Friendly Multicast Congestion Control (TFMCC): Protocol Specification, August 2006
- RFC 5052 - Forward Error Correction (FEC) Building Block, August 2007
- RFC 5401 - Multicast Negative-Acknowledgment (NACK) Building Blocks, November 2008
- RFC 5445 - Basic Forward Error Correction (FEC) Schemes, March 2009
- RFC 5740 - NACK-Oriented Reliable Multicast (NORM) Transport Protocol, November 2009

== See also ==
- Stream Control Transmission Protocol
