= SRM =

SRM may refer to:

== Organizations ==
- Schoberer Rad Meßtechnik, a manufacturer of bicycle accessories
- SRM University (disambiguation), several universities in India

== In computing ==
- srm (Unix), a secure file deletion tool for POSIX systems
- Scalable Reliable Multicast, a framework for reliable multicast network protocols
- Single Round Match, an online algorithm competition
- Storage resource management, of a network
- Structural risk minimization, in machine learning
- System Reference Manual firmware, for DEC Alpha-based computers
- Security risk management

== In statistics ==
- Sample ratio mismatch, a statistically significant difference between the expected and actual ratios of the sizes of treatment and control groups in an experiment

== In technology ==
- Solar radiation modification, technologies to reflect sunlight to reduce global warming
- Switched reluctance motor, a synchronous electric motor

== In chemistry ==
- SRM Engine Suite, software for simulating chemical combustion within IC engines
- Selected reaction monitoring, a method for targeted, mass spectrometry-based quantitative proteomics
- Selective receptor modulator, a type of drug
- Specified risk material, animal tissue that may transmit specific diseases
- Standard Reference Method, used to measure the relative darkness of a beer
- Standard Reference Material, a certified reference material that satisfies NIST-specific criteria

== Other ==
- Supplier relationship management
- Single Resolution Mechanism of the EU's banking union
- Wright SRM, a double-decker bus body manufactured by Wrightbus in Northern Ireland
- SRM Shineray, NEV brand of Shineray Group that produces electric light commercial vehicles.
- Spermidine synthase, a type of alkyltransferase
