= Multicast address =

Logical identifier addressing a specific group of devices on a network

A multicast address is a numerical identifier for a group of hosts in a computer network that are available to process datagrams or frames intended to be multicast for a designated network service. Multicast addressing can be used in the link layer (layer 2 in the OSI model), such as Ethernet multicast, and at the internet layer (layer 3 for OSI) for Internet Protocol Version 4 (IPv4) or Version 6 (IPv6) multicast.

== IPv4 ==
IPv4 multicast addresses are defined by the most-significant bit pattern of 1110. This originates from the classful network design of the early Internet when this group of addresses was designated as Class D. The CIDR notation for this group is 224.0.0.0/4. The group includes the addresses from 224.0.0.0 to 239.255.255.255.

The address range is divided into blocks, each assigned a specific purpose or behavior.

IP multicast address range	Description	Routable
224.0.0.0 to 224.0.0.255	Local subnetwork	No
224.0.1.0 to 224.0.1.255	Internetwork control	Yes
224.0.2.0 to 224.0.255.255	AD-HOC block 1	Yes
224.1.0.0 to 224.1.255.255	Reserved	
224.2.0.0 to 224.2.255.255	SDP/SAP block	Yes
224.3.0.0 to 224.4.255.255	AD-HOC block 2	Yes
224.5.0.0 to 224.255.255.255	Reserved	
225.0.0.0 to 231.255.255.255	Reserved	
232.0.0.0 to 232.255.255.255	Source-specific multicast	Yes
233.0.0.0 to 233.251.255.255	GLOP addressing	Yes
233.252.0.0 to 233.255.255.255	AD-HOC block 3	Yes
234.0.0.0 to 234.255.255.255	Unicast-prefix–based	Yes
235.0.0.0 to 238.255.255.255	Reserved	
239.0.0.0 to 239.255.255.255	Administratively scoped	Yes

Local subnetwork
Addresses in the range of 224.0.0.0 to 224.0.0.255 are individually assigned by IANA and designated for multicasting on the local subnetwork only. For example, the Routing Information Protocol (RIPv2) uses 224.0.0.9, Open Shortest Path First (OSPF) uses 224.0.0.5 and 224.0.0.6, and Multicast DNS uses 224.0.0.251. Routers must not forward these messages outside the subnet from which they originate.

Internetwork control block
Addresses in the range 224.0.1.0 to 224.0.1.255 are individually assigned by IANA and designated as the internetwork control block. This block of addresses is used for traffic that must be routed through the public Internet, such as for applications of the Network Time Protocol using 224.0.1.1.

AD-HOC block
Addresses in three separate blocks are not individually assigned by IANA. These addresses are globally routed and are used for applications that don't fit either of the previously described purposes.

SDP/SAP block
Addresses in the reserved 224.2.0.0/16 range are not individually assigned by IANA. Fallen out of use for security considerations, experimental Session Announcement Protocol was the primary means of supplying addresses through Session Description Protocol, which is now mostly used in the establishment of private sessions.

Source-specific multicast
The 232.0.0.0/8 (IPv4) and ff3x::/32 (IPv6) blocks are reserved for use by source-specific multicast.

GLOP
The 233.0.0.0/8 range was originally assigned as an experimental, public statically-assigned multicast address space for publishers and Internet service providers that wished to source content on the Internet. The allocation method is termed GLOP addressing and provides implementers a block of 255 addresses that is determined by their 16-bit autonomous system number (ASN) allocation. In a nutshell, the middle two octets of this block are formed from assigned ASNs, giving any operator assigned an ASN 256 globally unique multicast group addresses. The method is not applicable to the newer 32-bit ASNs. In September 2001, the IETF envisioned a broader use of the range for many-to-many multicast applications. Unfortunately, with only 256 multicast addresses available to each autonomous system, GLOP is not adequate for large-scale broadcasters.

Unicast-prefix–based
The 234.0.0.0/8 range is assigned as a range of global IPv4 multicast address space provided to each organization that has /24 or larger globally routed unicast address space allocated; one multicast address is reserved per /24 of unicast space. A resulting advantage over GLOP is that the unicast-prefix mechanism resembles the unicast-prefix capabilities of IPv6.

Administratively scoped
The 239.0.0.0/8 range is assigned for private use within an organization. Packets destined to administratively scoped IPv4 multicast addresses do not cross administratively defined organizational boundaries, and administratively scoped IPv4 multicast addresses are locally assigned and do not have to be globally unique. The 239.0.0.0/8 range may be structured to be loosely similar to the scoped IPv6 multicast address.

Ethernet-specific
In support of link-local multicasts which do not use IGMP, any IPv4 multicast address that falls within the *.0.0.0/24 and *.128.0.0/24 ranges will be broadcast to all ports on many Ethernet switches, even if IGMP snooping is enabled, so addresses within these ranges should be avoided on Ethernet networks where the functionality of IGMP snooping is desired.

=== Notable IPv4 multicast addresses ===
The following table is a list of notable well-known IPv4 addresses that are reserved for IP multicasting and that are registered with the Internet Assigned Numbers Authority (IANA).

IP multicast address	Description	Routable
224.0.0.0	Base address (reserved)	No
224.0.0.1	The All Hosts multicast group addresses all hosts on the same network segment.	No
224.0.0.2	The All Routers multicast group addresses all routers on the same network segment.	No
224.0.0.4	This address is used in the Distance Vector Multicast Routing Protocol (DVMRP) to address multicast routers.	No
224.0.0.5	The Open Shortest Path First (OSPF) All OSPF Routers address is used to send Hello packets to all OSPF routers on a network segment.	No
224.0.0.6	The OSPF All Designated Routers (DR) address is used to send OSPF routing information to designated routers on a network segment.	No
224.0.0.9	The Routing Information Protocol (RIP) version 2 group address is used to send routing information to all RIP2-aware routers on a network segment.	No
224.0.0.10	The Enhanced Interior Gateway Routing Protocol (EIGRP) group address is used to send routing information to all EIGRP routers on a network segment.	No
224.0.0.13	Protocol Independent Multicast (PIM) Version 2	No
224.0.0.18	Virtual Router Redundancy Protocol (VRRP)	No
224.0.0.19–21	IS-IS over IP	No
224.0.0.22	Internet Group Management Protocol (IGMP) version 3	No
224.0.0.102	Hot Standby Router Protocol version 2 (HSRPv2) / Gateway Load Balancing Protocol (GLBP)	No
224.0.0.107	Precision Time Protocol (PTP) version 2 peer delay measurement messaging	No
224.0.0.251	Multicast DNS (mDNS) address	No
224.0.0.252	Link-local Multicast Name Resolution (LLMNR) address	No
224.0.0.253	Teredo tunneling client discovery address	No
224.0.1.1	Network Time Protocol clients listen on this address for protocol messages when operating in multicast mode.	Yes
224.0.1.22	Service Location Protocol version 1 general	Yes
224.0.1.35	Service Location Protocol version 1 directory agent	Yes
224.0.1.39	The Cisco multicast router AUTO-RP-ANNOUNCE address is used by RP mapping agents to listen for candidate announcements.	Yes
224.0.1.40	The Cisco multicast router AUTO-RP-DISCOVERY address is the destination address for messages from the RP mapping agent to discover candidates.	Yes
224.0.1.41	H.323 Gatekeeper discovery address	Yes
224.0.1.129–132	Precision Time Protocol (PTP) version 1 messages (Sync, Announce, etc.) except peer delay measurement	Yes
224.0.1.129	Precision Time Protocol (PTP) version 2 messages (Sync, Announce, etc.) except peer delay measurement	Yes
224.0.23.12	KNXnet/IP discovery	Yes
239.255.0.0-239.255.249.255	sACN (streaming ACN) ANSI E1.31 standard. Used by all sACN-capable lighting consoles for multicast of lighting control data of 1 to 63,999 DMX512 universes, as a multicast (non-RDM) alternative to Artnet broadcast. Designed by the Entertainment Services and Technology Association (ESTA). Refer public tool to translate between sACN DMX universe number versus multicast IP.	No
239.255.255.250	Simple Service Discovery Protocol address	Yes
239.255.255.253	Service Location Protocol version 2 address	Yes

== IPv6 ==
Multicast addresses in IPv6 use the prefix ff00::/8.

General multicast address format
bits	8	4	4	112
field	prefix	flg	sc	group ID

For all multicast addresses, the prefix field holds the binary value 11111111.

Currently, three of the four flag bits in the flg field are defined; the most-significant flag bit is reserved for future use.

Multicast address flags
bit (Note: Bit count starting with 0)	flag	Meaning when 0	Meaning when 1
8	reserved	reserved	reserved
9	R (Rendezvous)	Rendezvous point not embedded	Rendezvous point embedded
10	P (Prefix)	Without prefix information	Address based on network prefix
11	T (Transient)	Well-known multicast address	Dynamically assigned multicast address

The four-bit scope field (sc) is used to indicate where the address is valid and unique.

In addition, the scope field is used to identify special multicast addresses, like solicited node.

Solicited-node multicast address format
bits	8	4	4	79	9	24
field	prefix	flg	sc	zeroes	ones	unicast address

The sc(ope) field holds the binary value 0010 (link-local). Solicited-node multicast addresses are computed as a function of a node's unicast or anycast addresses. A solicited-node multicast address is created by copying the last 24 bits of a unicast or anycast address to the last 24 bits of the multicast address.

Unicast-prefix–based multicast address format
bits	8	4	4	4	4	8	64	32
field	prefix	flg	sc	res	riid	plen	network prefix	group ID

Link-scoped multicast addresses use a comparable format.

Based on the value of the flag bits, IPv6 multicast addresses can be unicast-prefix–based multicast addresses, source-specific multicast addresses, or embedded–rendezvous-point IPv6 multicast addresses. Each of these types of multicast addresses have their own format and follow specific rules.

Similar to a unicast address, the prefix of an IPv6 multicast address specifies its scope; however, the set of possible scopes for a multicast address is different. The 4-bit scope field (bits 12 to 15) is used to indicate where the address is valid and unique.

Multicast address scope
IPv6 address (Note: x is a place holder indicating that the value of the flags field is unimportant in the current discussion.)	IPv4 equivalent	Scope	Purpose
ffx0::/16, ffxf::/16		Reserved	
ffx1::/16		Interface-local	Packets with this destination address may not be sent over any network link, but must remain within the current node; this is the multicast equivalent of the unicast loopback address.
ffx2::/16	224.0.0.0/24	Link-local	Packets with this destination address may not be routed anywhere.
ffx3::/16	239.255.0.0/16	Realm-Local scope	Local multicast particular to a network technology
ffx4::/16		Admin-local	The smallest scope that must be administratively configured.
ffx5::/16		Site-local	Restricted to the local physical network.
ffx8::/16	239.192.0.0/14	Organization-local	Restricted to networks used by the organization administering the local network. (For example, these addresses might be used over VPNs; when packets for this group are routed over the public internet (where these addresses are not valid), they would have to be encapsulated in some other protocol.)
ffxe::/16	224.0.1.0-238.255.255.255	Global scope	Eligible to be routed over the public internet.

The service is identified in the group ID field. For example, if ff02::101 refers to all Network Time Protocol (NTP) servers on the local network segment, then ff08::101 refers to all NTP servers in an organization's networks. The group ID field may be further divided for special multicast address types.

=== Notable IPv6 multicast addresses ===
The following table is a list notable IPv6 multicast addresses that are registered with IANA. To be included in some of the below multicast groups, a client must send a Multicast Listener Discovery (MLD), a component of the ICMPv6 suite, to join that group. For example, to listen to ff02::1:ff28:9c5a, a client must send an MLD report to the router, containing the multicast address, to indicate that it wants to listen to that group.

Address	Description
ff02::1	All nodes on the local network segment
ff02::2	All routers on the local network segment
ff02::5	OSPFv3 All SPF routers
ff02::6	OSPFv3 All DR routers
ff02::8	IS-IS for IPv6 routers
ff02::9	RIP routers
ff02::a	EIGRP routers
ff02::d	PIM routers
ff02::12	Virtual Router Redundancy Protocol (VRRP) version 3
ff02::16	MLDv2 reports
ff02::1:2	All DHCPv6 servers and relay agents on the local network segment
ff02::1:3	All LLMNR hosts on the local network segment
ff05::1:3	All DHCPv6 servers on the local network site
ff0x::c	Simple Service Discovery Protocol
ff0x::fb	Multicast DNS
ff0x::101	Network Time Protocol
ff0x::108	Network Information Service
ff0x::181	Precision Time Protocol (PTP) version 2 messages (Sync, Announce, etc.) except peer delay measurement
ff02::6b	Precision Time Protocol (PTP) version 2 peer delay measurement messages
ff0x::114	Used for experiments

== Ethernet ==
Ethernet frames with a value of 1 in the least-significant bit of the first octet (Note: On Ethernet, the least-significant bit of an octet is the first to be transmitted. A multicast is indicated by the first transmitted bit of the destination address being 1.) of the destination MAC address are treated as multicast frames and are flooded to all points on the network. While frames with ones in all bits of the destination address (FF-FF-FF-FF-FF-FF) are sometimes referred to as broadcasts, Ethernet generally does not distinguish between multicast and broadcast frames. Modern Ethernet controllers filter received packets to reduce CPU load by looking up the hash of a multicast destination address in a table, initialized by software, which controls whether a multicast packet is dropped or fully received.

The IEEE has allocated the address block 01-80-C2-00-00-00 to 01-80-C2-FF-FF-FF for group addresses for use by standard protocols. Of these, the MAC group addresses in the range of 01-80-C2-00-00-00 to 01-80-C2-00-00-0F are not forwarded by 802.1D-conformant MAC bridges.

Some well known Ethernet multicast addresses
Block	Ethernet multicast address	Ethertype	Usage
01-80-C2; IEEE (802 group)	01-80-C2-00-00-00	Local LAN Segment, stopping at STP-capable switches	
01-80-C2; IEEE (802 group)	01-80-C2-00-00-00	SNAP (length)	Spanning Tree Protocol (for bridges) IEEE 802.1D
01-80-C2; IEEE (802 group)	01-80-C2-00-00-00	0x88CC	Link Layer Discovery Protocol (additional)
01-80-C2; IEEE (802 group)	01-80-C2-00-00-01	0x8808	Ethernet flow control (pause frame) IEEE 802.3x
01-80-C2; IEEE (802 group)	01-80-C2-00-00-02	0x8809	"Slow protocols" including Ethernet OAM Protocol (IEEE 802.3ah) and Link Aggregation Control Protocol (LACP)
01-80-C2; IEEE (802 group)	01-80-C2-00-00-03	Local LAN Segment until next multi-port ("non-TPMR") switch	
01-80-C2; IEEE (802 group)	01-80-C2-00-00-03	0x888E	Port authentication (IEEE 802.1X EAPOL)
01-80-C2; IEEE (802 group)	01-80-C2-00-00-03	0x88CC	Link Layer Discovery Protocol (additional)
01-80-C2; IEEE (802 group)	01-80-C2-00-00-08	SNAP (length)	Spanning Tree Protocol (for provider bridges) IEEE 802.1ad
01-80-C2; IEEE (802 group)	01-80-C2-00-00-0D	0x88F5	Multiple VLAN Registration Protocol (for provider bridges) IEEE 802.1ad
01-80-C2; IEEE (802 group)	01-80-C2-00-00-0E	Local LAN Link, never crosses another device	
01-80-C2; IEEE (802 group)	01-80-C2-00-00-0E	0x88CC	Link Layer Discovery Protocol (primary)
01-80-C2; IEEE (802 group)	01-80-C2-00-00-0E	0x88F7	Precision Time Protocol (PTP) version 2 over Ethernet (802.1AS)
01-80-C2; IEEE (802 group)	01-80-C2-00-00-21	0x88F5	GARP VLAN Registration Protocol (also known as IEEE 802.1Q GVRP) Multiple VLAN Registration Protocol (MVRP)
01-80-C2; IEEE (802 group)	01-80-C2-00-00-30 through 01-80-C2-00-00-3F	0x8902	Ethernet CFM Protocol IEEE 802.1ag
01-1B-19; IEEE (TC9)	01-1B-19-00-00-00	0x88F7	Precision Time Protocol (PTP) version 2 over Ethernet (native layer-2) for electing the Grandmaster clock and advanced applications, otherwise 01-80-C2-00-00-0E
01-00-5E; ICANN/IANA	01-00-5E-00-00-00 through 01-00-5E-7F-FF-FF	0x0800	IPv4 Multicast: Insert the low 23 bits of the multicast IPv4 address into the Ethernet address
33-33-xx locally administered	33-33-00-00-00-00 through 33-33-FF-FF-FF-FF	0x86DD	IPv6 multicast: The low 32 bits an Ethernet address for IPv6 multicast traffic are the low 32 bits of the multicast IPv6 address used. For example, IPv6 multicast traffic using the address ff02::d uses the MAC address 33-33-00-00-00-0D, and traffic to ff05::1:3 goes to the MAC address 33-33-00-01-00-03.
01-0C-CD; IEC	01-0C-CD-01-00-00 through 01-0C-CD-01-01-FF	0x88B8	IEC 61850-8-1 GOOSE Type 1/1A
01-0C-CD; IEC	01-0C-CD-02-00-00 through 01-0C-CD-02-01-FF	0x88B9	GSSE (IEC 61850 8-1)
01-0C-CD; IEC	01-0C-CD-04-00-00 through 01-0C-CD-04-01-FF	0x88BA	Multicast sampled values (IEC 61850 8-1)
01-00-0C; Cisco Systems	01-00-0C-CC-CC-CC	SNAP (length)	Cisco Discovery Protocol (CDP), VLAN Trunking Protocol (VTP), Unidirectional Link Detection (UDLD)
01-00-0C; Cisco Systems	01-00-0C-CC-CC-CD	SNAP (length)	Cisco Shared Spanning Tree Protocol Address

== 802.11 ==
802.11 wireless networks use the same MAC addresses for multicast as Ethernet.

== See also ==
- Broadcast address
- Reserved IP addresses
