= ICMPv6 =

Internet protocol used for error messages in network operations

Internet Control Message Protocol for IPv6
- Communication protocol
- General structure of ICMPv6 Messages
- Abbreviation: ICMPv6
- Purpose: Auxiliary Protocol for IPv6
- Introduction: December 1995; 30 years ago
- OSI layer: Network layer
- RFC: 4443

Internet Control Message Protocol version 6 (ICMPv6) is the implementation of the Internet Control Message Protocol (ICMP) for Internet Protocol version 6 (IPv6). ICMPv6 is an integral part of IPv6 and performs error reporting and diagnostic functions.

ICMPv6 has a framework for extensions to implement new features. Several extensions have been published, defining new ICMPv6 message types as well as new options for existing ICMPv6 message types. For example, Neighbor Discovery Protocol (NDP) is a node discovery protocol based on ICMPv6 which replaces and enhances functions of ARP. Secure Neighbor Discovery (SEND) is an extension of NDP with extra security. Multicast Listener Discovery (MLD) is used by IPv6 routers for discovering multicast listeners on a directly attached link, much like Internet Group Management Protocol (IGMP) is used in IPv4. Multicast Router Discovery (MRD) allows the discovery of multicast routers.

== Message types and formats ==
ICMPv6 messages may be classified as error messages and information messages. ICMPv6 messages are transported by IPv6 packets in which the IPv6 Next Header value for ICMPv6 is set to the value 58.

The ICMPv6 message consists of a header and the protocol payload. The header contains only three fields: Type (8 bits), Code (8 bits), and Checksum (16 bits).

ICMPv6 message
Offset	Octet	0								1								2								3							
Octet	Bit	0	1	2	3	4	5	6	7	8	9	10	11	12	13	14	15	16	17	18	19	20	21	22	23	24	25	26	27	28	29	30	31
0	0	Type								Code								Checksum															
4	32	Message body																															
8	64	Message body																															
⋮	⋮	Message body																															

Type: 8 bits

Specifies the type of the message. Values in the range from 0 to 127 (high-order bit is 0) indicate an error message, while values in the range from 128 to 255 (high-order bit is 1) indicate an information message.

Code: 8 bits

The Code field value depends on the message type and provides an additional level of message granularity.

Checksum: 16 bits

Provides a minimal level of integrity verification for the ICMP message. The checksum is calculated from the ICMP message (starting with the Type field), prepended with an IPv6 pseudo-header. See below.

Message body: Variable

Contents depends on the message.

=== Types ===
Control messages are identified by the value in the type field. The code field gives additional context information for the message. Some messages serve the same purpose as the correspondingly named ICMP message types.

Type		Code	
Value	Meaning	Value	Meaning
ICMPv6 Error Messages
1	Destination unreachable	0	no route to destination
1	Destination unreachable	1	communication with destination administratively prohibited
1	Destination unreachable	2	beyond scope of source address
1	Destination unreachable	3	address unreachable
1	Destination unreachable	4	port unreachable
1	Destination unreachable	5	source address failed ingress/egress policy
1	Destination unreachable	6	reject route to destination
1	Destination unreachable	7	Error in Source Routing Header
2	Packet too big	0	
3	Time exceeded	0	hop limit exceeded in transit
3	Time exceeded	1	fragment reassembly time exceeded
4	Parameter problem	0	erroneous header field encountered
4	Parameter problem	1	unrecognized Next Header type encountered
4	Parameter problem	2	unrecognized IPv6 option encountered
100	Private experimentation		
101	Private experimentation		
127	Reserved for expansion of ICMPv6 error messages		
ICMPv6 Informational Messages
128	Echo Request	0	
129	Echo Reply	0	
130	Multicast Listener Query (MLD)	0	There are two subtypes of Multicast Listener Query messages: General Query, used to learn which multicast addresses have listeners on an attached link.; Multicast-Address-Specific Query, used to learn if a particular multicast address has any listeners on an attached link.; These two subtypes are differentiated by the contents of the Multicast Address field, as described in section 3.6 of RFC 2710
131	Multicast Listener Report (MLD)	0	
132	Multicast Listener Done (MLD)	0	
133	Router Solicitation (NDP)	0	
134	Router Advertisement (NDP)	0	
135	Neighbor Solicitation (NDP)	0	
136	Neighbor Advertisement (NDP)	0	
137	Redirect Message (NDP)	0	
138	Router Renumbering	0	Router Renumbering Command
138	Router Renumbering	1	Router Renumbering Result
138	Router Renumbering	255	Sequence Number Reset
139	ICMP Node Information Query	0	The Data field contains an IPv6 address which is the Subject of this Query.
139	ICMP Node Information Query	1	The Data field contains a name which is the Subject of this Query, or is empty, as in the case of a NOOP.
139	ICMP Node Information Query	2	The Data field contains an IPv4 address which is the Subject of this Query.
140	ICMP Node Information Response	0	A successful reply. The Reply Data field may or may not be empty.
140	ICMP Node Information Response	1	The Responder refuses to supply the answer. The Reply Data field will be empty.
140	ICMP Node Information Response	2	The Qtype of the Query is unknown to the Responder. The Reply Data field will be empty.
141	Inverse Neighbor Discovery Solicitation Message	0	
142	Inverse Neighbor Discovery Advertisement Message	0	
143	Multicast Listener Discovery (MLDv2) reports		
144	Home Agent Address Discovery Request Message	0	
145	Home Agent Address Discovery Reply Message	0	
146	Mobile Prefix Solicitation	0	
147	Mobile Prefix Advertisement	0	
148	Certification Path Solicitation (SEND)		
149	Certification Path Advertisement (SEND)		
151	Multicast Router Advertisement (MRD)		
152	Multicast Router Solicitation (MRD)		
153	Multicast Router Termination (MRD)		
155	RPL Control Message		
160	Extended Echo Request	0	Request Extended Echo
161	Extended Echo Reply	0	No Error
161	Extended Echo Reply	1	Malformed Query
161	Extended Echo Reply	2	No Such Interface
161	Extended Echo Reply	3	No Such Table Entry
161	Extended Echo Reply	4	Multiple Interfaces Satisfy Query
200	Private experimentation		
201	Private experimentation		
255	Reserved for expansion of ICMPv6 informational messages		

Note that the table above is not comprehensive. The current complete list of assigned ICMPv6 types can be found at this link: IANA: ICMPv6 Parameters.

=== Checksum ===
ICMPv6 provides a minimal level of message integrity verification by the inclusion of a 16-bit checksum in its header. The checksum is calculated starting with a pseudo-header of IPv6 header fields according to the IPv6 standard, which consists of the source and destination addresses, the packet length and the next header field, the latter of which is set to the value 58. Following this pseudo header, the checksum is continued with the ICMPv6 message. The checksum computation is performed according to Internet protocol standards using 16-bit ones' complement summation, followed by a final ones' complement of the checksum itself and inserting it into the checksum field. Note that this differs from the way it is calculated for IPv4 in ICMP, but is similar to the calculation done in TCP.

ICMPv6 pseudo-header
Offset	Octet	0								1								2								3							
Octet	Bit	0	1	2	3	4	5	6	7	8	9	10	11	12	13	14	15	16	17	18	19	20	21	22	23	24	25	26	27	28	29	30	31
0	0	Source Address																															
4	32	Source Address																															
8	64	Source Address																															
12	96	Source Address																															
16	128	Destination Address																															
20	160	Destination Address																															
24	192	Destination Address																															
28	224	Destination Address																															
32	256	ICMPv6 Length																															
36	288	Zeroes																								Next Header (58)							

=== Format ===
The payload of an ICMPv6 message varies according to the type of message being sent. It begins at bit 32 immediately after the header described above. For some messages such as destination unreachable or time exceeded there is no defined message body.

Destination Unreachable
Bit offset	0–7	8–15	16–31
0	1	Code	Checksum
32	Unused		
64	Message body (Variable Size)		

Time Exceeded
Bit offset	0–7	8–15	16–31
0	3	Code	Checksum
32	Unused		
64	Message body (Variable Size)		

Others define a use only for the first four bytes of the body with no other defined content:

Packet Too Big
Bit offset	0–7	8–15	16–31
0	2	0	Checksum
32	MTU		
64	Message body (Variable Size)		

Parameter Problem
Bit offset	0–7	8–15	16–31
0	4	Code	Checksum
32	Pointer		
64	Message body (Variable Size)		

Echo Request
Bit offset	0–7	8–15	16–31
0	128	0	Checksum
32	Identifier		Sequence Number
64	Data (Variable Size)		

Echo Reply
Bit offset	0–7	8–15	16–31
0	129	0	Checksum
32	Identifier		Sequence Number
64	Data (Variable Size)		

In the case of NDP messages the first four bytes are either reserved or used for flags/hoplimit. While the rest of the body has unspecified structured data:

Router Solicitation
Bit offset	0–7	8–15	16–31
0	133	0	Checksum
32	Reserved		
64	Options (Variable Size)		

Router Advertisement
Bit offset	0–7	8–15			16–31
0	134	0			Checksum
32	Cur Hop Limit	Managed Address Flag	Other Configuration Flag	Reserved	Router Lifetime
64	Reachable Time				
96	Retrans Time				
128	Options (Variable Size)				

Neighbor Solicitation
Bit offset	0–7	8–15	16–31
0	135	0	Checksum
32	Reserved		
64	Target Address (16 bytes)		
192	Options (Variable Size)		

Neighbor Advertisement
Bit offset	0–7			8–15	16–31
0	136			0	Checksum
32	From Router (R)	Solicited Flag(S)	Override(O)	Reserved	
64	Target Address (16 bytes)				
192	Options (Variable Size)				

For a redirect the first bytes of the message body are reserved but not used. This is followed by a Target and destination address. Unspecified options can be attached to the end:

ICMPv6 Redirect
Bit offset	0–7	8–15	16–31
0	137	0	Checksum
32	Reserved		
64	Target Address (16 bytes)		
192	Destination Address (16 bytes)		
320	Options (Variable Size)		

== Message processing ==
When an ICMPv6 node receives a packet, it must undertake actions that depend on the type of message. The ICMPv6 protocol must limit the number of error messages sent to the same destination to avoid network overloading. For example, if a node continues to forward erroneous packets, ICMP will signal the error to the first packet and then do so periodically, with a fixed minimum period or with a fixed network maximum load. An ICMP error message must never be sent in response to another ICMP error message.
