= Mbone =

Former computer network

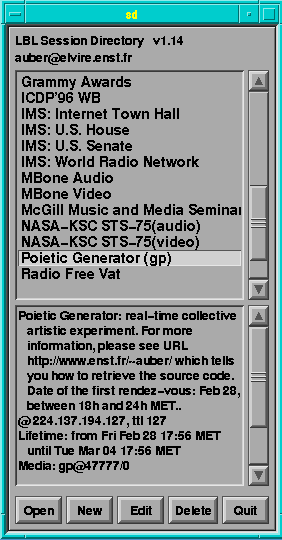
Mbone session directory (sd), February 1996

Mbone (short for "multicast backbone") was an experimental backbone and virtual network built on top of the Internet for carrying IP multicast traffic on the Internet. It was developed in the early 1990s and required specialized hardware and software. Since the operators of most Internet routers have disabled IP multicast due to concerns regarding bandwidth tracking and billing, the Mbone was created to connect multicast-capable networks over the existing Internet infrastructure.

== History ==
Mbone was created by Van Jacobson, Steve Deering and Stephen Casner in 1992 based on a suggestion by Allison Mankin.

During March 16–20, 1992 the first significant use of the MBONE took place from the Internet Engineering Task Force (IETF) meeting in San Diego with 20 sites listening.

On May 23, 1993, Wax or the Discovery of Television Among the Bees was streamed over the Mbone, becoming "the first movie to be transmitted on the Internet."

On June 24, 1993, the band Severe Tire Damage was the first to perform live on the Mbone.

On November 11, 1993 Sky Cries Mary performed on the Mbone from Bellevue, WA sponsored by Starwave.

On August 23, 1994, the band Deth Specula broadcast the first live concert over the Mbone.

A November 1994 Rolling Stones concert at the Cotton Bowl in Dallas with 50,000 fans was the "first major cyberspace multicast concert." Mick Jagger opened the concert by saying, "I wanna say a special welcome to everyone that's, uh, climbed into the Internet tonight and, uh, has got into the M-bone. And I hope it doesn't all collapse."

A year later the Mbone was used, this time symmetrically (simultaneous transmission and reception without hierarchy among participants), for a first experience of real-time graphical interaction without the intermediary of any Center (Poietic Generator).

By 1995, there were M-bone links in Russia, as well as at the McMurdo Sound research station in Antarctica. Mbone was predominantly used by research and scientific entities, including NASA.

Mbone was used for shared communication such as video teleconferences or shared collaborative workspaces. It was not generally connected to commercial Internet service providers, but often to universities and research institutions. Some other projects and network testbeds, such as Internet2's Abilene Network, made Mbone obsolete.

A "virtual room video conferencing system" (VRVS) started operation in 1997 using the Mbone, and was in operation through 2008.

A revived mboned (mbone deployment) working group was chartered by the Internet Engineering Task Force in 2014, as a forum to coordinate and document multicast deployment challenges and best practices.

== Details ==
The purpose of Mbone was to minimize the amount of data required for multipoint audio/video-conferencing.

Mbone was free and it used a network of routers that support IP multicast, and it enables access to real-time interactive multimedia on the Internet. Many older routers do not support IP multicast. To cope with this, tunnels must be set up on both ends: multicast packets are encapsulated in unicast packets and sent through a tunnel. Mbone uses a small subset of the class D IP address space (224.0.0.0–239.255.255.255) assigned for multicast traffic. Mbone uses 224.2.0.0 for multimedia conferencing.

=== Characteristics ===
- topology: a combination of mesh and star networks
- IP addresses: 224.2.0.0
- routing schemes: DVMRP, MOSPF
- session registration: IGMP
- traffic requirement: audio 32-64 kbit/s, video 120 kbit/s

=== Mbone tools ===
- Videoconferencing: vic -t ttl destination-host/port (supports: NV, H.261, CellB, MPEG, mJPEG)
- Audioconferencing: vat -t ttl destination-host/port (supports: LPC, PCMU, DVI4, GSM)
- Whiteboard: wb destination-host/port/ttl
- Session Directory: sdr
- Collective art : gp (Poietic Generator)

== See also ==
- CastGate—an attempt at providing connectivity to the multicast network for hosts which have none
