= Narada (disambiguation) =

Narada is a sage from early Hindu texts.

Narada may also refer to:

== People ==
- Narada, one of the 28 Buddhas said to have attained enlightenment from the time Gautama Buddha attained his first definite prophecy from Dipankara Buddha
- Narada Bernard (b. 1981), a Jamaican football (soccer) player
- Narada Maha Thera (1898-1983), a Sri Lankan Buddhist monk
- Narada Michael Walden (b. 1952), an American music producer, drummer, singer, and songwriter

== Other uses ==
- Narada, a place name in Yamanashi Prefecture, Japan
- Ňárad, a village and municipality of south-west Slovakia
- Narada News, a defunct Indian online news portal
- Narada Productions, a record label
- Narada multicast protocol, an overlay protocol for multicast communication on computer networks
- Narada, a Romulan mining vessel from the future in the 2009 film Star Trek
- Narada Purana, a Hindu religious text
- USS Narada (SP-161), a United States Navy patrol vessel in commission from 1917 to 1919

== See also ==
- Narda (disambiguation)
- Bhaktha Naradar, a 1942 Indian film
- Naradan, 2022 Indian film by Aashiq Abu
