= MRD =

MRD may refer to:

== Medicine ==
- Medical records department in a hospital
- Minimal residual disease, low levels of leukaemia cells present in the body after or during treatment

== Sports ==
- Mad Rollin' Dolls, Woman's Flat Track Roller Derby League in Madison, WI, USA
- Manchester Roller Derby, co-ed roller derby league in Manchester, England

== Technology ==
- Market requirements document, used in technology product development and planning
- Multicast router discovery network protocol
- Machine-readable dictionary

== Transport ==
- Alberto Carnevalli Airport in IATA code
- Meridian LRT station, Singapore, LRT station abbreviation

== Other ==
- Mandy Rice-Davies, British former model and showgirl
- Marching Royal Dukes, the official marching band of James Madison University in Harrisonburg, Virginia
- Required minimum distribution, also called minimum required distribution, US IRS requirement for age-based retirement account distributions
- Miss Dominican Republic (Spanish: Miss República Dominicana)
- Motor Racing Developments Ltd., racing car constructor better known as Brabham
- Movement for the Restoration of Democracy, political alliance in Pakistan

== Fiction ==
- Mutant Response Division, fictional Marvel Comics organization
- MRD, fictional substance used for time travel in the 2015 film Synchronicity
