= Scalable video multicast =

Multicast technology

Scalable video multicast is a new wireless multicast technology. In scalable video multicast, the video program subscribers can view the program in accordance with their link conditions. The scalable video multicast has been employed by many standards, such as MBMS, MBS, and DVB-H.

Traditional mobile networks were initially designed for unicast services, and may waste radio network resources by transmitting the same content in multiple copies to different users. With video multicasting, more efficient resource utilization would however be possible. Multicast service is therefore, a significant part of the current mobile services. Examples include the Multicast/Broadcast Service (MBS) over the WiMAX, the Multimedia Broadcast/Multicast Service (MBMS) within the LTE, the Digital Video Broadcasting services (e.g., DVB-T, DVB-H) defined in European Telecommunication Standard (ETS), and the MediaFLO presented by Qualcomm.

In mobile networks, all frames with multicast Receiver Address are transmitted at one of the rates included in a basic rate set. In order to guarantee coverage to all associated users, the transmission rate is typically fixed to one of the low basic rates. This limits the rate at which multicast data can be sent, for example, high-definition video is hard to send via multicast. To address this problem, scalable video multicasting (SVM) technology has been proposed. In SVM, video is encoded into one base layer (BL) and several enhancement layers (ELs) by using Scalable Video Coding (SVC) technique. The BL ensures the basic video quality of all users and each additional EL further enhances the quality of the video.

== See also ==
- Layered coding - general technique of similar approach:
- LC EVC = MPEG-5 Part 2 - technique of similar approach, agnostic to Base Layer Video Codec
- AV1 codec with Scalable approach mode
- Scalable Video Technology umbrella of codecs, including: SVT-AV1, SVT-VP9 and SVT-HEVC encoders look up: Scalability Extensions (SHVC)
- Computer compatibility
- Scalable Video Coding - MPEG-4/AVC specific technique of similar approach
