= Session Announcement Protocol =

The Session Announcement Protocol (SAP) is an experimental protocol for advertising multicast session information. SAP typically uses Session Description Protocol (SDP) as the format for Real-time Transport Protocol (RTP) session descriptions. Announcement data is sent using IP multicast and the User Datagram Protocol (UDP).

Under SAP, senders periodically transmit SDP descriptions to a well-known multicast address and port number (9875). A listening application constructs a guide of all advertised multicast sessions.

SAP was published by the IETF as RFC 2974.

== Announcement interval ==
The announcement interval is cooperatively modulated such that all SAP announcements in the multicast delivery scope, by default, consume 4000 bits per second. Regardless, the maximum announce interval is 300 seconds (5 minutes). Announcements automatically expire after 10 times the announcement interval or one hour, whichever is greater. Announcements may also be explicitly withdrawn by the original issuer.

== Authentication, encryption and compression ==
SAP features separate methods for authenticating and encrypting announcements. Use of encryption is not recommended. Authentication prevents unauthorized modification and other DoS attacks. Authentication is optional. Two authentication schemes are supported:

- Pretty Good Privacy as defined in RFC 2440
- Cryptographic Message Syntax as defined in RFC 5652

The message body may optionally be compressed using the zlib format as defined in RFC 1950.

== Applications and implementations ==
VLC media player monitors SAP announcements and presents the user a list of available streams.

SAP is one of the optional discovery and connection management techniques described in the AES67 audio-over-Ethernet interoperability standard.
