= Narda (disambiguation) =

Narda is a Philippine rock band.

Narda may also refer to:

- Narda, Hungary, a village in Hungary
- Narda Onyx (1931–1991), an American actress
- Narda, a character in Mandrake the Magician
- Narda Custodio, alter ego of the fictional Filipino superhero Darna
- "Narda", a 2006 song by Kamikazee from the album Maharot
- Narda, a firm which specialized in the RF and Microwave Product industries, later known as Narda Microwave-West
- Narda Vell., a taxonomic synonym of Strychnos

== See also ==
- List of storms named Narda
- Narada (disambiguation)
