= Narada multicast protocol =

Protocol used to implement multicast functionality on computer networks

The Narada multicast protocol is a set of specifications which can be used to implement overlay multicast functionality on computer networks.

It constructs an overlay tree from a redundantly meshed graph of nodes, source specific shortest path trees are then constructed from reverse paths. The group management is equally distributed on all nodes because each overlay node keeps track of all its group members through periodic heartbeats of all members. The discovery and tree building is similar to DVMRP.
