= Core-based trees =

Core-based trees (CBT) is a proposal for making IP Multicast scalable by constructing a tree of routers. It was first proposed in a paper by Ballardie, Francis, and Crowcroft. What differentiates it from other schemes for multicasting is that the routing tree comprises multiple "cores" (also known as "centres"). The locations of the core routers are statically configured. Other routers are added by growing "branches" of a tree, comprising a chain of routers, from the core routers out towards the routers directly adjacent to the multicast group members.
