= Source-specific multicast =

Delivering multicast packets based on source and destination addressing

Source-specific multicast (SSM) is a method of delivering multicast packets in which the only packets that are delivered to a receiver are those originating from a specific source address requested by the receiver. By limiting based on source, SSM reduces demands on the network and improves security.

SSM requires that the receiver specify the source address and explicitly excludes the use of the (*,G) join for all multicast groups in RFC 3376. Source specification is possible only in IPv4's IGMPv3 and IPv6's MLDv2.

== Any-source multicast (as counterexample) ==
Source-specific multicast is best understood in contrast to any-source multicast (ASM). In the ASM service model, a receiver expresses interest in traffic to a multicast address. The multicast network must

1. discover all multicast sources sending to that address, and
2. route data from all sources to all interested receivers.

This behavior is particularly well suited to groupware applications where

1. all participants in the group want to be aware of all other participants, and
2. the list of participants is not known in advance.

The source discovery burden on the network can become significant when the number of sources is large.

== Operation ==
In the SSM service model, in addition to the receiver expressing interest in traffic to a multicast address, the receiver expresses interest in receiving traffic from only one specific source sending to that multicast address. This relieves the network of discovering many multicast sources and reduces the amount of multicast routing information that the network must maintain.

SSM requires support in last-hop routers and in the receiver's operating system. SSM support is not required in other network components, including routers and even the sending host. Interest in multicast traffic from a specific source is conveyed from hosts to routers using IGMPv3 as specified in RFC 4607.

SSM destination addresses must be in the range 232.0.0.0/8 for IPv4. For IPv6, current allowed SSM destination addresses are specified by ff3x::/96, where the hexadecimal digit x represents the scope. Note however that the allocation may be extended in the future so receivers and network equipment should treat any ff3x::/32 address as SSM.
