= Internet Group Management Protocol =

Protocol for establishing multicast group memberships on IPv4 networks

- Communication protocol
- OSI layer: Network layer
- IP number: Runs directly over IPv4 (IP protocol 2)
- RFCs: 1112 (IGMPv1); 2236 (IGMPv2); 3376 (IGMPv3); 4604 (SSM Extensions)
- Hardware: Switches (IGMP Snooping) and Routers

The Internet Group Management Protocol (IGMP) is a communications protocol used by hosts and adjacent routers on IPv4 networks to establish multicast group memberships. IGMP is an integral part of IP multicast and allows the network to direct multicast transmissions only to hosts that have requested them.

IGMP can be used for one-to-many networking applications such as online streaming video and gaming, and allows more efficient use of resources when supporting these types of applications.

IGMP is used on IPv4 networks. Multicast management on IPv6 networks is handled by Multicast Listener Discovery (MLD), which is a part of ICMPv6 in contrast to IGMP's bare IP encapsulation.

== Architecture ==
A network designed to deliver a multicast service using IGMP might use this basic architecture:

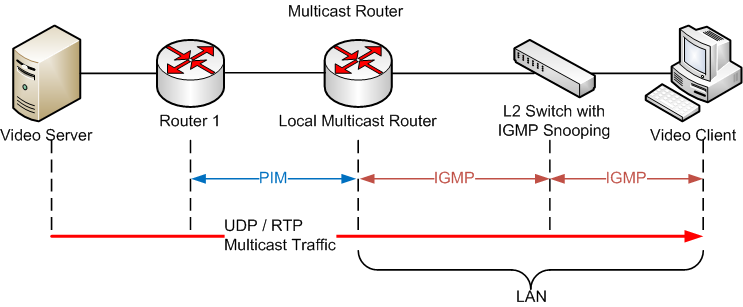

IGMP operates between a host and a local multicast router. Switches featuring IGMP snooping also derive useful information by observing these IGMP transactions. Protocol Independent Multicast (PIM) is then used between the local and remote multicast routers to direct multicast traffic from hosts sending multicasts to hosts that have registered through IGMP to receive them.

IGMP operates on the network layer (layer 3), just the same as other network management protocols like ICMP.

IGMP is implemented on hosts and within routers. A host requests membership to a group through its local router, while a router listens for these requests and periodically sends out subscription queries. A single router per subnet is elected to perform this querying function. Some multilayer switches include an IGMP querier capability to allow their IGMP snooping features to work in the absence of an IGMP-capable router in the layer 2 network.

IGMP is vulnerable to some attacks, and firewalls commonly allow the user to disable it if not needed.

== Versions ==
There are three versions of IGMP. IGMPv1 was defined in 1989. IGMPv2, defined in 1997, improves IGMPv1 by adding the ability for a host to signal a desire to leave a multicast group.

In 2002, IGMPv3 improved IGMPv2 by supporting source-specific multicast and introduces membership report aggregation. The support for source-specific multicast was improved in 2006.

The three versions of IGMP are backward compatible. A router supporting IGMPv3 can support clients running IGMPv1, IGMPv2, and IGMPv3. IGMPv1 uses a query-response model. Queries are sent to 224.0.0.1. Membership reports are sent to the group's multicast address. IGMPv2 accelerates the process of leaving a group and adjusts other timeouts. Leave-group messages are sent to 224.0.0.2. A group-specific query is introduced. Group-specific queries are sent to the group's multicast address. A means for routers to select an IGMP querier for the network is introduced. IGMPv3 introduces source-specific multicast capability. Membership reports are sent to 224.0.0.22.

== Messages ==
There are several types of IGMP messages:

General membership queries
Sent by multicast routers to determine which multicast addresses are of interest to systems attached to the network(s) they serve to refresh the group membership state for all systems on its network.
Group-specific membership queries
Used for determining the reception state for a particular multicast address.
Group-and-source-specific queries
Allow the router to determine if any systems desire reception of messages sent to a multicast group from a source address specified in a list of unicast addresses.
Membership reports
Sent by multicast receivers in response to a membership query or asynchronously when first registering for a multicast group.
Leave group messages
Sent by multicast receivers when specified multicast transmissions are no longer needed at the receiver.

IGMP messages are carried in bare IP packets with IP protocol number 2. Similar to the Internet Control Message Protocol, there is no transport layer used with IGMP messaging.

=== IGMPv2 messages ===
IGMPv2 packet structure
Offset	Octet	0								1								2								3							
Octet	Bit	0	1	2	3	4	5	6	7	8	9	10	11	12	13	14	15	16	17	18	19	20	21	22	23	24	25	26	27	28	29	30	31
0	0	Type								Maximum Response Time								Checksum															
4	32	Group Address																															

Type: 8 bits
Indicates the message type as follows:

Message	Type value
Membership Query	0x11
IGMPv1 Membership Report	0x12
IGMPv2 Membership Report	0x16
IGMPv3 Membership Report	0x22
Leave Group	0x17

Maximum Response Time: 8 bits
Specifies the required responsiveness of replies to a Membership Query (0x11). This field is meaningful only in Membership Query; in other messages, it is set to 0 and ignored by the receiver. The field specifies time in units of 0.1 seconds (a field value of 10 specifies 1 second). Larger values reduce IGMP traffic burstiness and smaller values improve protocol responsiveness when the last host leaves a group.
Checksum: 16 bits
This is the 16-bit ones' complement of the ones' complement sum of the entire IGMP message. Computed before sending, with this field set to zero. When re-computed on reception of the packet, this field is included, and the result should be zero.
Group Address: 32 bits
This is the multicast address being queried when sending a Group-Specific or Group-and-Source-Specific Query. The field is zeroed when sending a General Query.
The message is sent to the following IP multicast addresses:

Message type	Multicast address
General Query	All hosts (224.0.0.1)
Group-Specific Query	The group being queried
Membership Report (all IGMP versions)	The group being reported
Leave Group	All routers (224.0.0.2)

=== IGMPv3 membership query ===
IGMPv3 membership query
Offset	Octet	0								1								2								3							
Octet	Bit	0	1	2	3	4	5	6	7	8	9	10	11	12	13	14	15	16	17	18	19	20	21	22	23	24	25	26	27	28	29	30	31
0	0	Type (0x11)								Maximum Response Code								Checksum															
4	32	Group Address																															
8	64	Reserved				S	QRV			QQIC								Number of Sources (N)															
12	96	Source Address[1]																															
16	128	Source Address[2]																															
⋮	⋮	⋮																															
$8+4n$	$64+32n$	Source Address[n]																															

Type: 8 bits
Indicates the type of the packet. A value of 0x11 indicates IGMPv3 Membership Query.
Maximum Response Code: 8 bits
This field is used to compute the Maximum Response Time (in 1/10 second increments) allowed before sending a responding report. If the number is below 128, the value is used directly. If the value is 128 or more, it is interpreted as an exponent and mantissa.
Checksum: 16 bits
This is the 16-bit ones' complement of the ones' complement sum of the entire IGMP message. Computed before sending, with this field set to zero. When recomputed on reception of the packet, this field is included, and the result should be zero.
Group Address: 32 bits
This is the multicast address being queried when sending a Group-Specific or Group-and-Source-Specific Query. The field is zeroed when sending a General Query.
Reserved: 4 bits
This field is reserved. It should be zeroed when sent and ignored when received.
Suppress Router-side Processing (S): 1 bit
When this flag is set, it indicates to receiving routers that they are to suppress the normal timer updates.
Querier's Robustness Variable (QRV): 3 bits
If this is non-zero, it contains the Robustness Variable value used by the sender of the query. Routers should update their Robustness Variable to match the most recently received query unless the value is zero. QRV sets tolerance for packet loss, allowing up to QRV - 1 lost packets. Zero is invalid, one is discouraged; default is 2.
Querier's Query Interval Code (QQIC): 8 bits
This code is used to specify the Query Interval value (in seconds) used by the querier. If the number is below 128, the value is used directly. If the value is 128 or more, it is interpreted as an exponent and mantissa.
Number of Sources (N): 16 bits
This field specifies the number of source addresses present in the query. For General and Group-Specific Queries, this value is zero. For Group-and-Source-Specific Queries, this value is non-zero, but limited by the network's MTU.
Source Address [i]: 32 bits
The Source Address [i] fields are a vector of n IP unicast addresses, where n is the value in the Number of Sources (N) field.

=== IGMPv3 membership report ===
IGMPv3 membership report
Offset	Octet	0								1								2								3							
Octet	Bit	0	1	2	3	4	5	6	7	8	9	10	11	12	13	14	15	16	17	18	19	20	21	22	23	24	25	26	27	28	29	30	31
0	0	Type (0x22)								Reserved								Checksum															
4	32	Reserved																Number of Group Records (M)															
8	64	Group Record[1]																															
⋮	⋮	Group Record[2]																															
⋮	⋮	⋮																															
⋮	⋮	Group Record[m]																															

Type: 8 bits
Indicates the type of the packet. A value of 0x22 indicates IGMPv3 Membership Report.
Checksum: 16 bits
This is the 16-bit ones' complement of the ones' complement sum of the entire IGMP message. Computed before sending, with this field set to zero. When recomputed on reception of the packet, this field is included, and the result should be zero.
Number of Group Records (M): 16 bits
This field specifies the number of group records present in the report.
Group Record [i]: Variable
Each Group Record is a block of fields containing information pertaining to the sender's membership in a single multicast group on the interface from which the Report is sent.

IGMPv3 group record
Offset	Octet	0								1								2								3							
Octet	Bit	0	1	2	3	4	5	6	7	8	9	10	11	12	13	14	15	16	17	18	19	20	21	22	23	24	25	26	27	28	29	30	31
0	0	Record Type								Aux Data Len								Number of Sources (N)															
4	32	Multicast Address																															
8	64	Source Address[1]																															
12	96	Source Address[2]																															
⋮	⋮	⋮																															
$8+4n$	$64+32n$	Source Address[n]																															
⋮	⋮	Auxiliary Data																															

Record Type: 8 bits
Indicates the type of the record.

IGMPv3 Group Record Types
Value	Record Type	Name	Description
0x01	Current-State Record	MODE_IS_INCLUDE	Filter allows the source addresses
0x02	Current-State Record	MODE_IS_EXCLUDE	Filter blocks the source addresses
0x03	Filter-Mode-Change Record	CHANGE_TO_INCLUDE_MODE	Filter allows the source addresses
0x04	Filter-Mode-Change Record	CHANGE_TO_EXCLUDE_MODE	Filter blocks the source addresses
0x05	Source-List-Change Record	ALLOW_NEW_SOURCES	Filter allows the source addresses, as well as previously-allowed addresses
0x06	Source-List-Change Record	BLOCK_OLD_SOURCES	Filter blocks the source addresses, but keeps previously-allowed addresses

Aux Data Len: 8 bits
This field contains the length of the Auxiliary Data field in this record, in units of 32-bit words. It may contain zero to indicate the absence of any auxiliary data.
Number of Sources (N): 16 bits
This field specifies the number of source addresses present in the group record.
Source Address [i]: 32 bits
The Source Address [i] fields are a vector of n IP unicast addresses, where n is the value in the Number of Sources (N) field.
Auxiliary Data: Variable
This field, if present, contains additional information pertaining to this Group Record. It is not used in the IGMPv3 standard.

== Implementations ==
FreeBSD, (Note: IGMPv3 was added to FreeBSD in version 8.0.) Linux (Note: IGMPv3 was added in the Linux 2.5 kernel series.) and Windows all support IGMP on the host side.
