= Multicast Listener Discovery =

Protocol for discovering IPv6 multicast listeners

Multicast Listener Discovery (MLD) is a component of the Internet Protocol Version 6 (IPv6) suite. MLD is used by IPv6 routers for discovering multicast listeners on a directly attached link, much like Internet Group Management Protocol (IGMP) is used in IPv4. Instead of being implemented as a separate protocol, the protocol is embedded in ICMPv6. MLDv1 is similar to IGMPv2 and MLDv2 similar to IGMPv3..

== Protocol ==
The following ICMPv6 message types are used:

ICMPv6 message type values
Message	Type value
Multicast Listener Query	130
MLDv1 Multicast Listener Report	131
MLDv2 Multicast Listener Report	143
Multicast Listener Done	132

All MLDv1/MLDv2 messages have a link-local IPv6 Source Address (fe80::/10). MLDv2 Reports may be sent from the unspecified address (::/128) if no valid link-local IPv6 source address is present.

MLDv2 Multicast Listener Reports are sent to ff02::16, to which all MLDv2-capable multicast routers listen.

== Support ==
Several operating systems support MLDv2:

- Windows Vista and later
- FreeBSD since release 8.0
- The Linux kernel since 2.5.68
- macOS
