= Matthew Prescott =

American ballet dancer

Matthew Prescott, born and raised in Idaho, is a danseur performing with the Morphoses/The Wheeldon Company. He attended the Joffrey/New School University in New York City and in 2000 was invited to join the Joffrey Ballet. He has also worked with Donald Byrd's Spectrum Dance Theater, Alonzo King's LINES Ballet and Complexions Contemporary Ballet; in 2005 he joined the Suzanne Farrell Ballet.

As a choreographer, he was in charge of the lead boys in the North American productions of Billy Elliot the Musical.
