= Drew Jacoby =

American contemporary ballet dancer

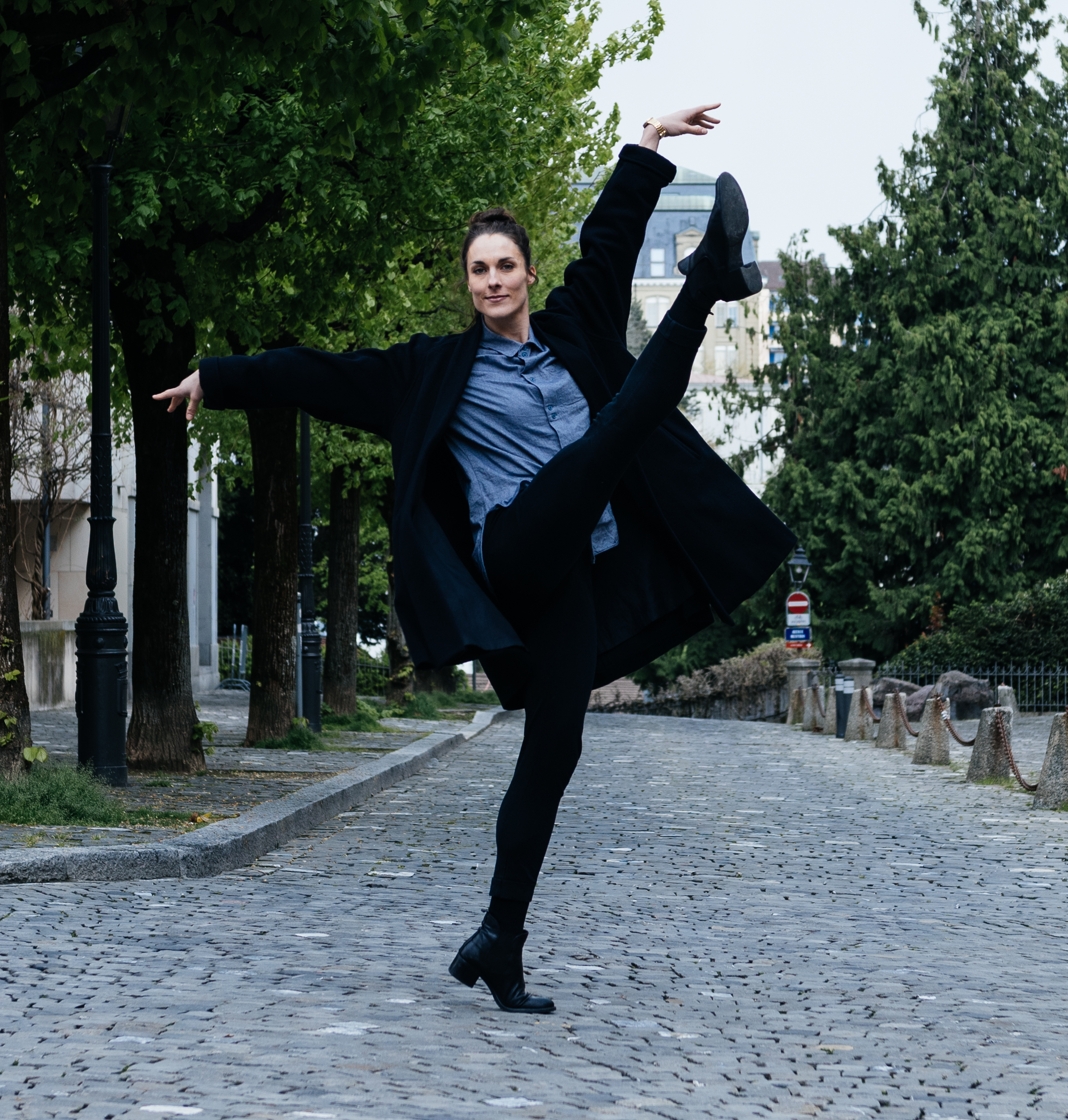
- Born: September 2, 1984 (age 40); Boise, Idaho, US
- Years active: 2002-present
- Career
- Current group: Royal Ballet of Flanders
- Former groups: Alonzo King LINES Ballet; Nederlands Dans Theater

Drew Jacoby (born September 2, 1984) is an American contemporary ballet dancer. As of 2020, she is a principal dancer of Royal Ballet of Flanders.

== Early life ==
Jacoby was born in Boise, Idaho in 1984. She trained at the School of American Ballet, the San Francisco Ballet and Pacific Northwest Ballet.

== Career ==
In 2002, at age 17, Jacoby joined Alonzo King LINES Ballet in San Francisco, at the invitation of Alonzo King. While at the Lines Ballet, Jacoby became a principal dancer and had numerous original works created on her by King. In 2005, she joined Sylvie Guillem's Japan tour, which she danced with dancers from The Royal Ballet and Paris Opera Ballet.

In 2007 she moved to New York City to begin her freelance career, and market herself independently from a ballet company. In 2008, she formed an independent dance duo Jacoby & Pronk with Complexions Contemporary Ballet dancer Rubinald Pronk. The dual has danced with Dutch National Ballet and Morphoses/The Wheeldon Company. In 2010, Jacoby performed alongside David Hallberg, premiering Lauri Stalling's Both.

Jacoby danced with Nederlands Dans Theater from 2012 to 2015. Her partnership with Pronk therefore ended. She joined the Royal Ballet of Flanders as a principal dancer in 2015, where she danced works by Pina Bausch, William Forsythe and Maurice Béjart, and worked with choreographers such as Sidi Larbi Cherkaoui and Jonah Bokaer. In 2019, Jacoby returned to the US to perform at Maria Kochetkova's solo program, Catch Her If You Can at the Joyce Theater. The program also featured works choreographed by Jacoby, danced by herself and Kochetkova.

== Selected repertory ==
Jacoby's repertory with the Royal Ballet of Flanders includes:

- Café Müller (Pina Bausch)
- Approximate Sonata (William Forsythe)
- The Sleeping Beauty (Marcia Haydée after Marius Petipa): Lilac Fairy
- Boléro (Maurice Béjart): Melody

=== Created roles ===
- Requiem (Sidi Larbi Cherkaoui)
- The Nutcracker (Demis Volpi): Cake Aunt
- Shahrazad (Jonah Bokaer)
- Exhibition (Larbi Cherkaoui): Lady in the Long Dress
- Ma Mère l’Oye (Jeroen Verbruggen): Alma
- Fall (Sidi Larbi Cherkaoui)

== Film ==
Jacoby has appeared in several films and videos, including the short film I Will Fall For You, directed by Sidi Larbi Cherkaoui and Woodkid. Jacoby portrayed American dancer and theatrical pioneer Loie Fuller in the 2019 film Radioactive, starring Rosamund Pike and Sam Riley.

== Awards and honours ==
- Princess Grace Award, 2005
- Dance Magazine's "It Girl", 2007

== Filmography ==
Year	Title	Role	Director	Notes
2019	Radioactive	Loie Fuller	Marjane Satrapi	
2017	I Will Fall For You	Herself	Sidi Larbi Cherkaoui, Woodkid	Video short
2012	Figure Studies	Herself	David Michalek, Razor Rocco Rizzotti	Video short
2010	Catfish	Dancer: Morphoses	Henry Joost, Ariel Schulman	
