= Aesha Ash =

American ballet dancer and teacher

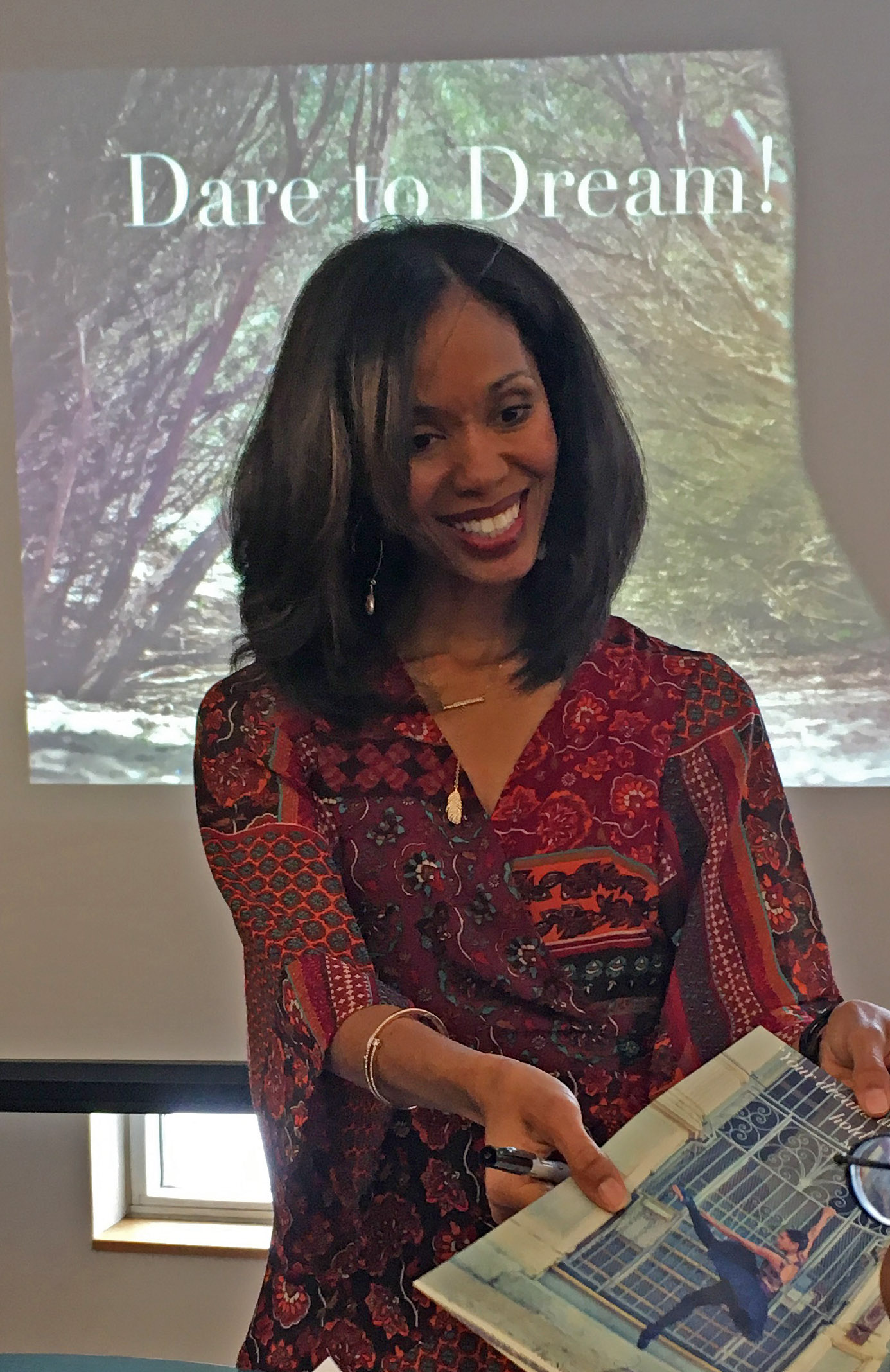
- Aesha Ash, 2018
- Born: December 30, 1977 (age 48); Rochester, New York
- Education: School of American Ballet
- Occupations: ballet dancer; teacher
- Years active: 1995-2009
- Children: 2
- Dancing career
- Former groups: New York City Ballet; Béjart Ballet; Alonzo King LINES Ballet; Morphoses/The Wheeldon Company

Aesha Ash (born December 30, 1977) is an American ballet dancer and teacher. She danced numerous leading roles as a member of New York City Ballet's corps de ballet and as a soloist with Béjart Ballet and Alonzo King LINES Ballet, and Morphoses/The Wheeldon Company. Following her retirement from performing, she founded The Swan Dreams Project in 2011 to dispel stereotypes about Black women in ballet. In 2020, she became the first African-American female faculty member at the School of American Ballet.

== Early life ==
Ash was born and raised in Rochester, New York. She started ballet, tap and jazz at 5 at a local studio. When she was 10, she switched studio to focus on ballet. At age 13, she traveled to New York City to train at School of American Ballet's summer intensive. She attended the course two more years before being accepted as a full-time student. She won the Mae L. Wien Awards for Outstanding Promise in 1996. She will become the school's associate chair of faculty in summer 2022.

== Career ==
In 1996, after leading the SAB student workshop as the lead in Balanchine's Rubies, Ash joined the New York City Ballet at the age of 18. She was the only Black woman in the company at the time and remained in the corps de ballet. During the 1998 City Ballet season, she, Alexandra Ansanelli, Edward Liang and Benjamin Millepied were all profiled by New York Times for their distinction as excellent dancers with the company. While with the company she performed leading roles in Balanchine's The Nutcracker, Who Cares?, Valse-Fantaisie, Le Tombeau de Couperin, Vienna Waltzes, Tchaikovsky Suite No. 3, Square Dance, Coppelia, Midsummer's Night Dream, Symphony in C, and Albert Evans' Haiku and August Bournonville's Bournonville Divertissements as staged by Stanley Williams. Ash departed the company in 2003 following her father's death, having grown tired of facing years of discrimination as well as being encouraged to leave by City Ballet's director, Peter Martins, who informed her that he did not see her career progressing any further than it already had.

That same year, she was introduced to choreographer Maurice Béjart, who invited her to perform with his company, Béjart Ballet in Lausanne, Switzerland, as a soloist. In an interview with Dance Magazine, Ash revealed that she did not enjoy her time at Bejart and left after 2 years because she was constantly being typecast in roles with "fierce, strong energy", and denied the opportunity to revel in her softer side.

She returned to the U.S. in 2005 to perform with Alonzo King LINES Ballet, a contemporary ballet company in San Francisco. Five months after joining the company, she was profiled by KQED, where she acknowledged the difficulty of changing companies, but her willingness to do so in pursuit of greater artistic challenges. Concurrent with this period, she also toured with Christopher Wheeldon's troupe Morphoses/The Wheeldon Company between 2007 and 2008. She retired from dancing at the end of that year.

In 2011, Ash founded the Swan Dream Project to encourage African-American children to start ballet. For the project, she was photographed in full ballet attire in order to raise fund for other projects that also promoted diversity in ballet. The project also has a summer camp in Ash's hometown, Rochester, and an after-school program in San Jose, California, where Ash resided. In 2016, she won the Women Making History Award from National Women's History Museum for her works. That same year, she was profiled for her work in The Guardian as "an elite ballerina helping everyone feel welcome onstage." She was also featured in the book The Ballerina's Little Black Book.

In 2015, when the School of American Ballet (SAB) started their diversity committee, Ash was one of the founding members. She taught the school's workshop in California the following year, was an SAB guest faculty member for the 2016–2017 school year, and was the visiting faculty chair between 2018 and 2020. In July 2019, she gave a TEDx talk about the importance of leaving one's comfort zones in order to "find home". Ash was invited to join the permanent faculty of the School of American Ballet in 2019, though she did not accept the position until January

2020, making her the school's first African-American female full-time faculty member. Her tenure started in September 2020. Rochester Museum & Science Center celebrated her appointment by declaring her one of its "women who changed the world 'change makers'", along with a dedicated exhibit in her honor. Soon after her appointment, she appeared on the Kelly Clarkson Show where she shared her story, spoke about the challenges she faced as a Black woman in ballet, and invited a young aspiring dancer to visit the New York and to tour the School of American Ballet after the pandemic was lifted. In January 2021, she was invited by Disney's Dreamers Academy to speak about her journey and share her message “to never let anyone define who you are.”

In December 2021, it was announced that Ash will become the School of American Ballet's associate chair of faculty, a newly created position, in summer 2022, while Darla Hoover will be the chair of faculty.

== Film ==
In 2001, Ash appeared in Richard Blanshard's documentary Living a Ballet Dream. Additional appearances include New York City Ballet Work Out II, Sesame Street, and Barbie in the Nutcracker. She also served as Zoe Saldaña's dance double during more complex sequences in the 2000 film Center Stage.

== Personal life ==
Ash is married to Natale Ruello, a vice president at Forward Networks, and has two children. They lived in San Jose, California until 2020, then moved to New York when Ash took up her position at the School of American Ballet.

== Awards ==
- 1996: Mae L. Wien Award for Outstanding Promise
- 2016: NWHM Women Making History Award
