= Network engineering =

Network engineering may refer to:

- Internetworking, service requirements for switched telephone networks
- Computer network engineering, the design and management of computer networks
- Telecommunications Engineering, developing telecommunications network topologies
- Broadcasting, spreading messages to a dispersed audience electronically
- Cybersecurity, protecting internet-connected systems—including hardware, software, networks, and data—from malicious digital attacks, unauthorized access, or damage

== See also ==
- Network administrator
