= Multicast routing =

One-to-many computer networking protocol

Routing schemes
Unicast

Broadcast

Multicast

Anycast

Multicast routing is one of the routing protocols in IP networking.

There are several multicast routing protocols supporting communications where data transmission is addressed to a group of destination computers simultaneously: Multicast Source Discovery Protocol, Multicast BGP, Protocol Independent Multicast.

== Overview ==
Multicast routing is a method of transmitting to all subscribers registered in a group by one transmission unlike unicast routing (i.e. OSPF, RIP) which transmits 1: 1 necessary data. To implement the multicast routing, Internet Group Management Protocol (IGMP) and a multicast routing protocol (Reverse-path forwarding, PIM-SM) for registration subscriber grouping and control traffic are required for multicast transmission. Regarding IP multicast, it is a technique for one-to-many communication over an IP network. IP multicast covers some part of common multicast routing protocol. IP multicast also describe IP multicast software (i.e. VideoLAN,qpimd – PIM Daemon for Quagga, GNU — PIM module for the Quagga Routing Suite, UFTP, etc.). The multicast routing is specific and broad range of protocols for layer-3 routing protocol for multicast feature and it is defined in RFC 5110.

== Routing mechanism ==
A multicast routing protocol is a mechanism for constructing a loop-free shortest path from a source host that sends data to the multiple destinations that receives the data. IPv4 uses Class D address (224.0.0.0 ~ 239.255.255.255) IPv6 multicast provides the previous feature of IPv4 and a new IPv6 feature, allowing a host to send a single data stream to a subset of all hosts (group transmission) concurrently. There are four types of Well-Known IPv6 Multicast address range : ff02::1: All IPv6 devices,•ff02::2: All IPv6 routers,•ff02::5: All OSPFv3 routers,•ff02::a: All EIGRP (IPv6) routers.

== The Multicast tree classification ==
There are two types of Multicast trees which are the Source-based tree and Group Shared tree.

=== Source based tree (SBT) ===
Its SSM (Source Specific Multicast) protocol. The maximum delay is short between End-to-end communication. It has poor scalability. (it is difficult to apply large network) Supported protocols include DVMRP, MOSPF, PIM-DM

=== Group Shared tree ===
It is Core-Based Tree, selecting one router in the network as the root and transmitting information through the root router. Maximum delay in the tree is longer than SBT(Source-based tree), The core router manages all the information, and the remaining routers manage the direction of the core and the multicast information requested by the current neighboring router. it has a Good Scalability (applicable to large networks). Supported protocols include CBT, PIM-SM, etc.

== See also ==
- Anycast
- Any-source multicast
- Broadcast address
- Comparison of streaming media systems
- Content delivery network
- Flooding algorithm
- Network speaker
- Internet television
- List of streaming media systems
- Mbone, experimental multicast backbone network
- Multicast address
- Multicast lightpaths
- Non-broadcast multiple-access network
- Packet forwarding
- Push technology
- Session Announcement Protocol
- Source-specific multicast
- Broadcast, Unknown-Unicast and Multicast traffic
