= Public address system =

Electronic system for amplifying sound

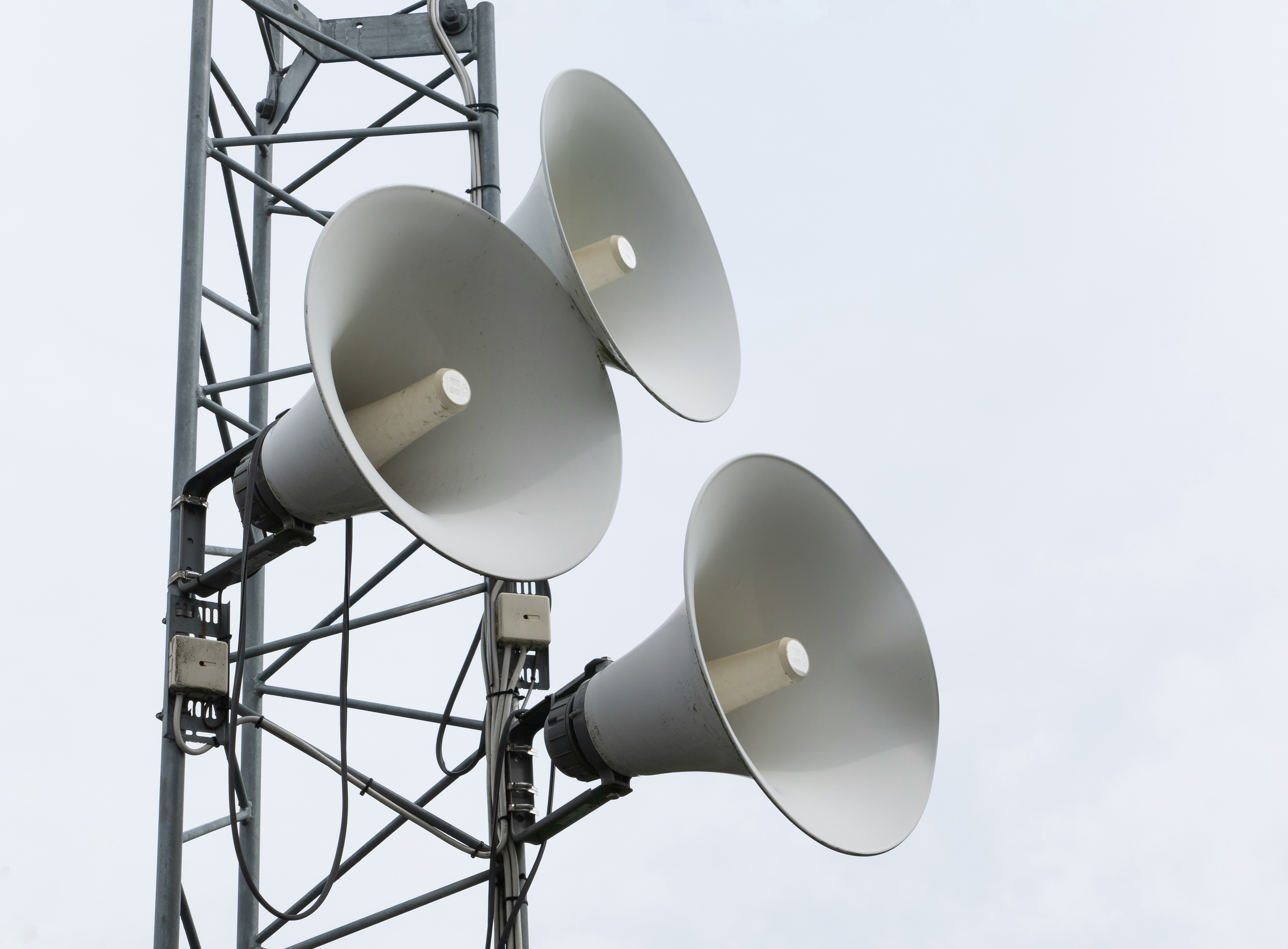
Horn loudspeakers are often used to broadcast sound in outdoor locations.

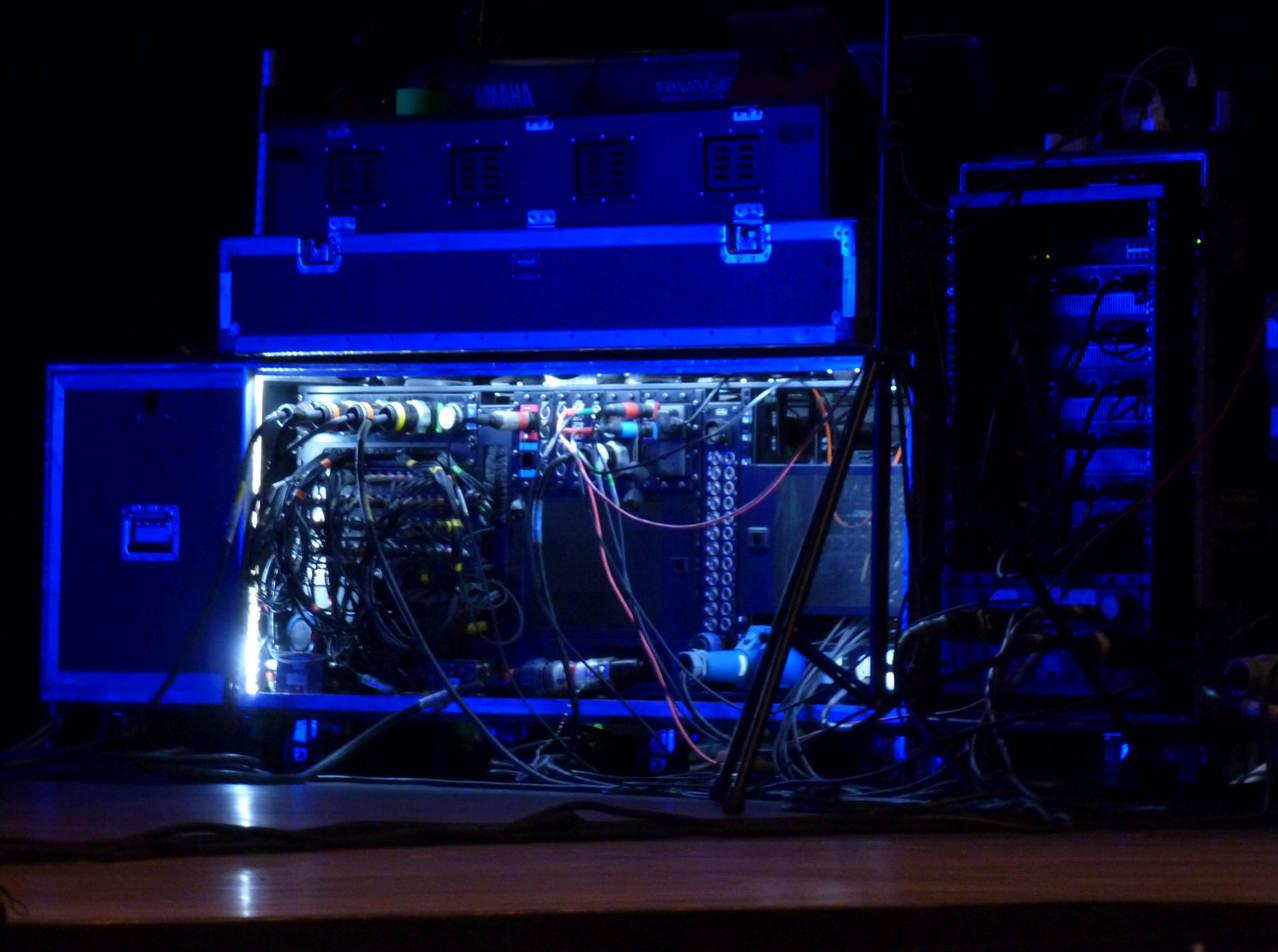
Rear panel of a medium-sized PA system, positioned at one side of the stage at a concert of the musical group Dead Can Dance in 2022, the size being about 3 m from left to right. The setup includes the mixing console for the sound engineer (operating interface with slide controls etc. on the rear) and also the power amplifiers with loudspeaker cables; not in the picture are only the loudspeaker systems distributed around the stage.

A public address system (also known as Tannoy or PA system) is an electronic system comprising microphones, amplifiers, loudspeakers, and related equipment. It increases the apparent volume (loudness) of a human voice, musical instrument, or other acoustic sound source or recorded sound or music. PA systems are used in any public venue that requires that an announcer, performer, etc. be sufficiently audible at a distance or over a large area. Typical applications include sports stadiums, public vehicles and facilities, and live or recorded music venues and events. A PA system may include multiple microphones or other sound sources, a mixing console to combine and modify multiple sources, and multiple amplifiers and loudspeakers for louder volume or wider distribution.

Simple PA systems are often used in small venues such as school auditoriums, churches, and small bars. PA systems with many speakers are widely used to make announcements in public, institutional and commercial buildings and locations—such as schools, stadiums, and passenger vessels and aircraft. Intercom systems, installed in many buildings, have both speakers throughout a building and microphones in many rooms so occupants can respond to announcements. PA and intercom systems are commonly used as part of an emergency communication system.

The term sound reinforcement system generally means a PA system used specifically for live music or other performances. In Britain, PA systems are often known as tannoys after a company of that name that supplied many of the systems used there.

== Early systems ==
=== Megaphone ===
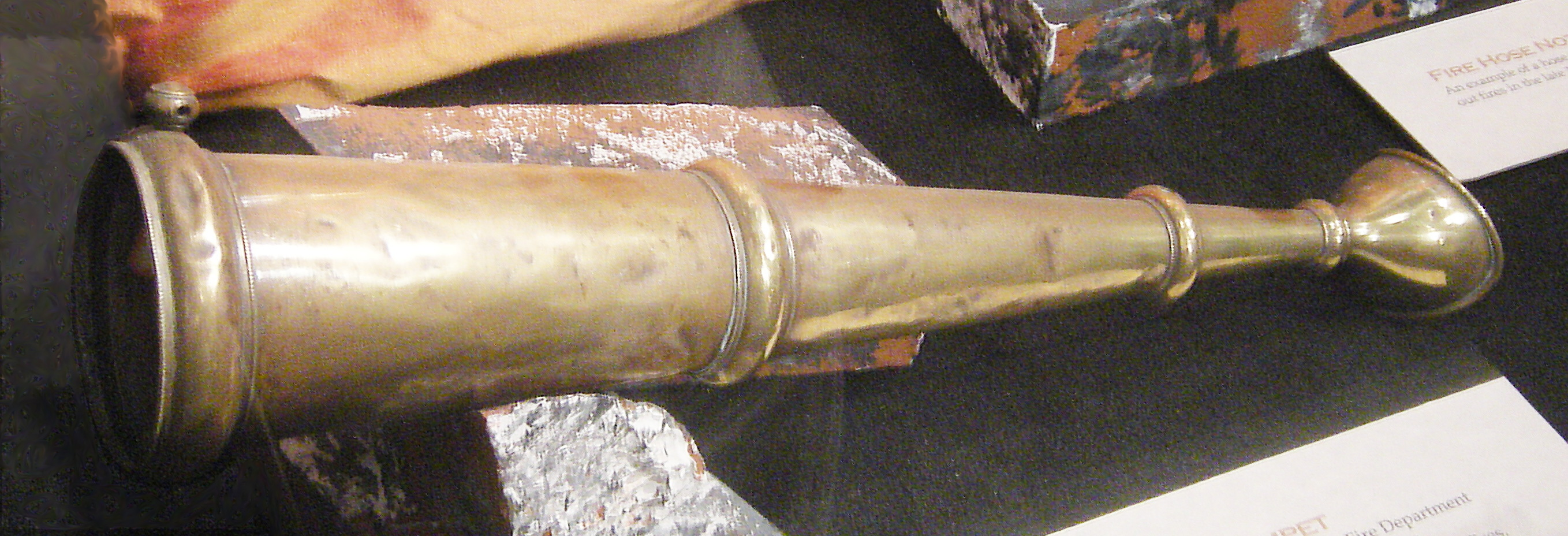
A late 19th-century speaking trumpet used by firefighters

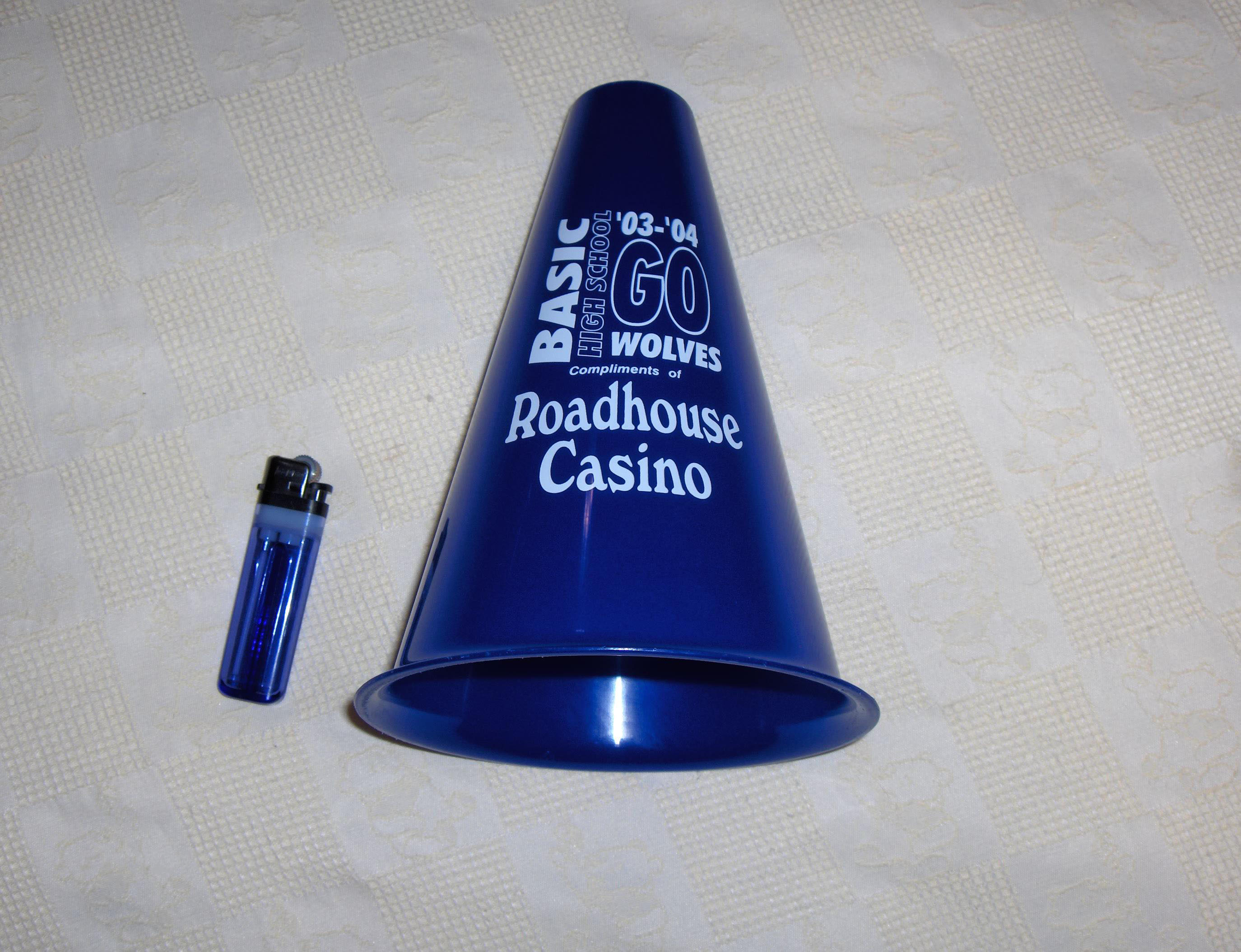
A small sports megaphone for cheering at sporting events, next to a 3 in (8 cm) cigarette lighter for scale

From the Ancient Greek era to the nineteenth century, before the invention of electric loudspeakers and amplifiers, megaphone cones were used by people speaking to a large audience to make their voice project more in a large space or group. Megaphones are typically portable, usually hand-held, cone-shaped acoustic horns used to amplify a person's voice or other sounds and direct it towards a given direction. The sound is introduced into the narrow end of the megaphone by holding it up to the face and speaking into it. The sound projects out the wide end of the cone. The user can direct the sound by pointing the wide end of the cone in a specific direction. In the 2020s, cheerleading is one of the few fields where a nineteenth-century-style cone is still used to project the voice. The device is also called "speaking-trumpet", "bullhorn" or "loud hailer".

=== Automatic Enunciator ===
In 1910, the Automatic Electric Company of Chicago, Illinois, already a major supplier of automatic telephone switchboards, announced it had developed a loudspeaker, which it marketed under the name of the Automatic Enunciator. Company president Joseph Harris foresaw multiple potential uses, and the original publicity stressed the value of the invention as a hotel public address system, allowing people in all public rooms to hear announcements. In June 1910, an initial "semi-public" demonstration was given to newspaper reporters at the Automatic Electric Company building, where a speaker's voice was transmitted to loudspeakers placed in a dozen locations "all over the building".

A short time later, the Automatic Enunciator Company formed in Chicago to market the new device, and a series of promotional installations followed. In August 1912 a large outdoor installation was made at a water carnival held in Chicago by the Associated Yacht and Power Boat Clubs of America. Seventy-two loudspeakers were strung in pairs at forty-foot (12 meter) intervals along the docks, spanning a total of one-half mile (800 meters) of grandstands. The system was used to announce race reports and descriptions, carry a series of speeches about "The Chicago Plan", and provide music between races.

In 1913, multiple units were installed throughout the Comiskey Park baseball stadium in Chicago, both to make announcements and to provide musical interludes, with Charles A. Comiskey quoted as saying: "The day of the megaphone man has passed at our park." The company also set up an experimental service, called the Musolaphone, that was used to transmit news and entertainment programming to home and business subscribers in south-side Chicago, but this effort was short-lived. The company continued to market the enunciators for making announcements in establishments such as hospitals, department stores, factories, and railroad stations, although the Automatic Enunciator Company was dissolved in 1926.

Advertisements for Automatic Enunciator public address systems

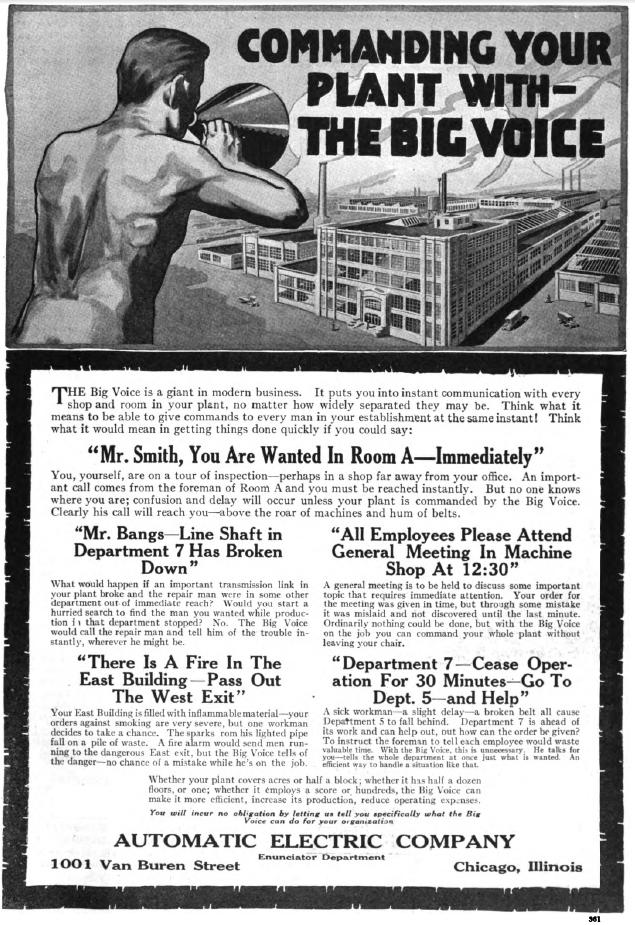
Factory, February 1918, page 361

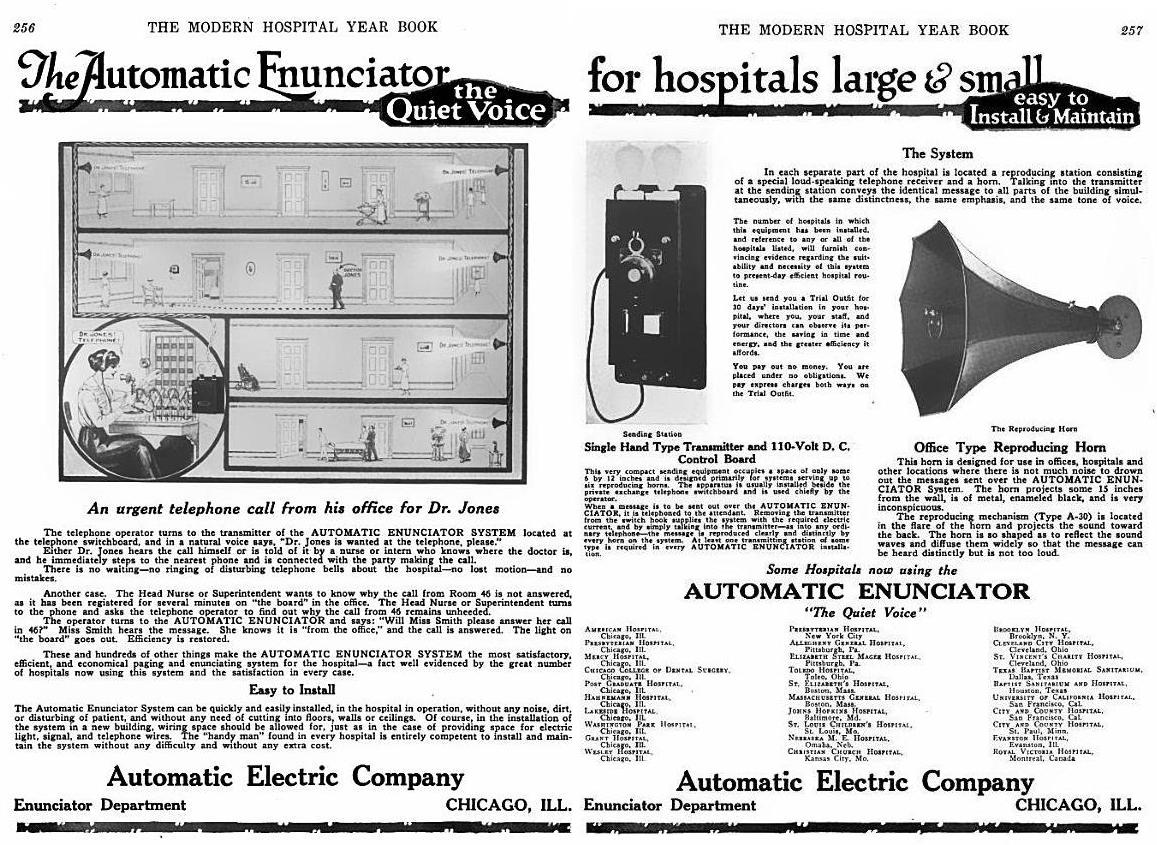
The Modern Hospital Yearbook, 1919, pages 256–257

=== Magnavox ===
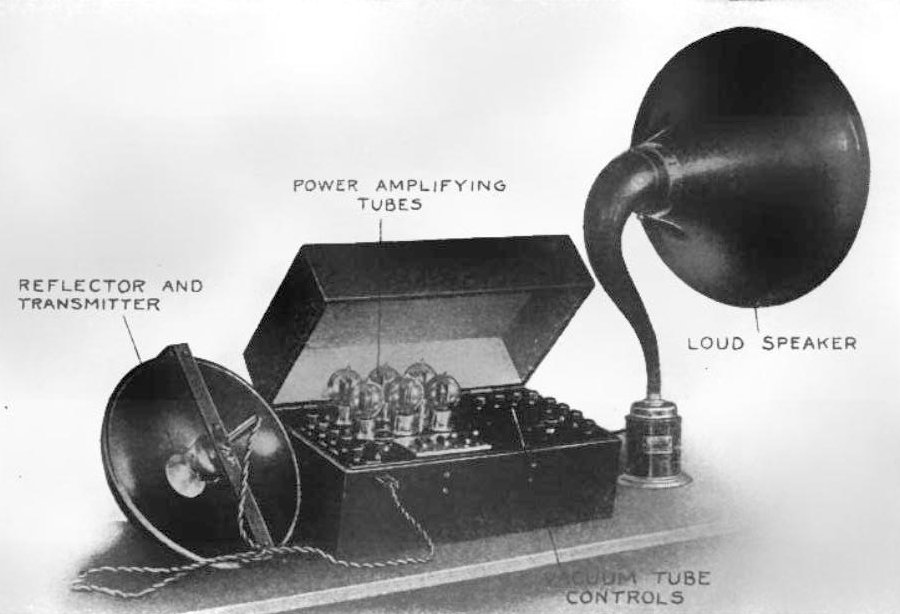
Early public-address system from around 1920 using a Magnavox speaker. The microphone had a metal reflector that concentrated the sound waves, allowing the speaker to stand back so it would not obscure his or her face. The early vacuum tubes could not produce much gain, and even with six tubes the amplifier had low power. To produce enough volume, the system used a horn loudspeaker. The cylindrical driver unit under the horn contained the diaphragm, which the voice coil vibrated to produce sound through a flaring horn. It produced far more volume from a given amplifier than a cone speaker. Horns were used in virtually all early PA systems, and are still used in most systems, at least for the high-range tweeters.

Peter Jensen and Edwin Pridham of Magnavox began experimenting with sound reproduction in the 1910s. Working from a laboratory in Napa, California, they filed the first patent for a moving coil loudspeaker in 1911. Four years later, in 1915, they built a dynamic loudspeaker with a 1-inch (2.5 cm) voice coil, a 3-inch (7.6 cm) corrugated diaphragm and a horn measuring 34 inches (86 cm) with a 22-inch (56 cm) aperture. The electromagnet created a flux field of approximately 11,000 Gauss.

Their first experiment used a carbon microphone. When the 12 V battery was connected to the system, they experienced one of the first examples of acoustic feedback, a typically unwanted effect often characterized by high-pitched sounds. They then placed the loudspeaker on the laboratory's roof, and claims say that the amplified human voice could be heard 1 mile (1.6 km) away. Jensen and Pridham refined the system and connected a phonograph to the loudspeaker so it could broadcast recorded music. They did this on a number of occasions, including once at the Napa laboratory, at the Panama–Pacific International Exposition, and on December 24, 1915, at San Francisco City Hall alongside Mayor James Rolph. This demonstration was official presentation of the working system, and approximately 100,000 people gathered to hear Christmas music and speeches "with absolute distinctness".

The first outside broadcast was made one week later, again supervised by Jensen and Pridham. On December 30, when Governor of California Hiram Johnson was too ill to give a speech in person, loudspeakers were installed at the Civic Auditorium in San Francisco, connected to Johnson's house some miles away by cable and a microphone, from where he delivered his speech. Jensen oversaw the governor using the microphone while Pridham operated the loudspeaker.

The following year, Jensen and Pridham applied for a patent for what they called their "Sound Magnifying Phonograph". Over the next two years they developed their first valve amplifier. In 1919 this was standardized as a 3-stage 25-watt amplifier.

This system was used by former US president William Howard Taft at a speech in Grant Park, Chicago, and first used by a current president when Woodrow Wilson addressed 50,000 people in San Diego, California. Wilson's speech was part of his nationwide tour to promote the establishment of the League of Nations. It was held on September 9, 1919, at City Stadium. As with the San Francisco installation, Jensen supervised the microphone and Pridham the loudspeakers. Wilson spoke into two large horns mounted on his platform, which channelled his voice into the microphone. Similar systems were used in the following years by Warren G. Harding and Franklin D. Roosevelt.

=== Marconi ===
By the early 1920s, Marconi had established a department dedicated to public address and began producing loudspeakers and amplifiers to match a growing demand. In 1925, George V used such a system at the British Empire Exhibition, addressing 90,000 via six long-range loudspeakers. This public use of loudspeakers brought attention to the possibilities of such technology. The 1925 Royal Air Force Pageant at Hendon Aerodrome used a Marconi system to allow the announcer to address the crowds, as well as amplify the band. In 1929, the Schneider Trophy race at Calshot Spit used a public address system that had 200 horns, weighing a total of 20 tons.

=== Late 1920s–1930s ===
Engineers invented the first loud, powerful amplifier and speaker systems for public address systems and movie theaters. These large PA systems and movie theatre sound systems were very large and very expensive, and so they could not be used by most touring musicians. After 1927, smaller, portable AC mains-powered PA systems that could be plugged into a regular wall socket "quickly became popular with musicians"; indeed, "... Leon McAuliffe (with Bob Wills) still used a carbon mic and a portable PA as late as 1935." During the late 1920s to mid-1930s, small portable PA systems and guitar combo amplifiers were fairly similar. These early amps had a "single volume control and one or two input jacks, field coil speakers" and thin wooden cabinets; remarkably, these early amps did not have tone controls or even an on-off switch. Portable PA systems that could be plugged into wall sockets appeared in the early 1930s, when the introduction of electrolytic capacitors and rectifier tubes enabled economical built-in power supplies that could plug into wall outlets. Previously, amplifiers required heavy multiple battery packs.

=== Electric megaphone ===
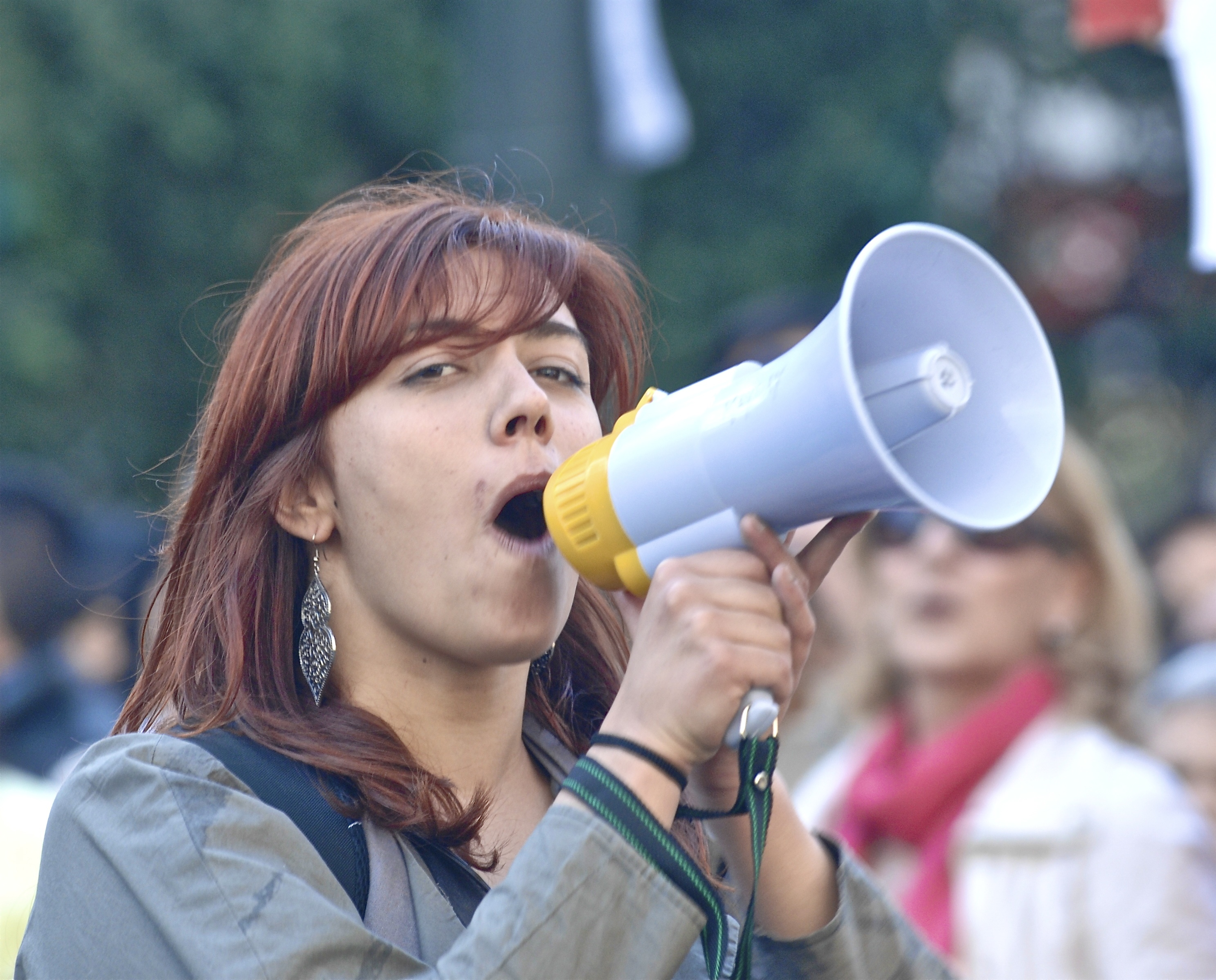
A woman using a small handheld electric megaphone at a demonstration in Portugal. Electric megaphones use a type of horn loudspeaker called a reflex or reentrant horn.

In the 1960s, an electric-amplified version of the megaphone, which used a loudspeaker, amplifier and a folded horn, largely replaced the basic cone-style megaphone. Small handheld, battery-powered electric megaphones are used by fire and rescue personnel, police, protesters, and people addressing outdoor audiences. With many small handheld models, the microphone is mounted at the back end of the device, and the user holds the megaphone in front of her/his mouth to use it, and presses a trigger to turn on the amplifier and loudspeaker. Larger electric megaphones may have a microphone attached by a cable, which enables a person to speak without having their face obscured by the flared horn.

== Small systems ==
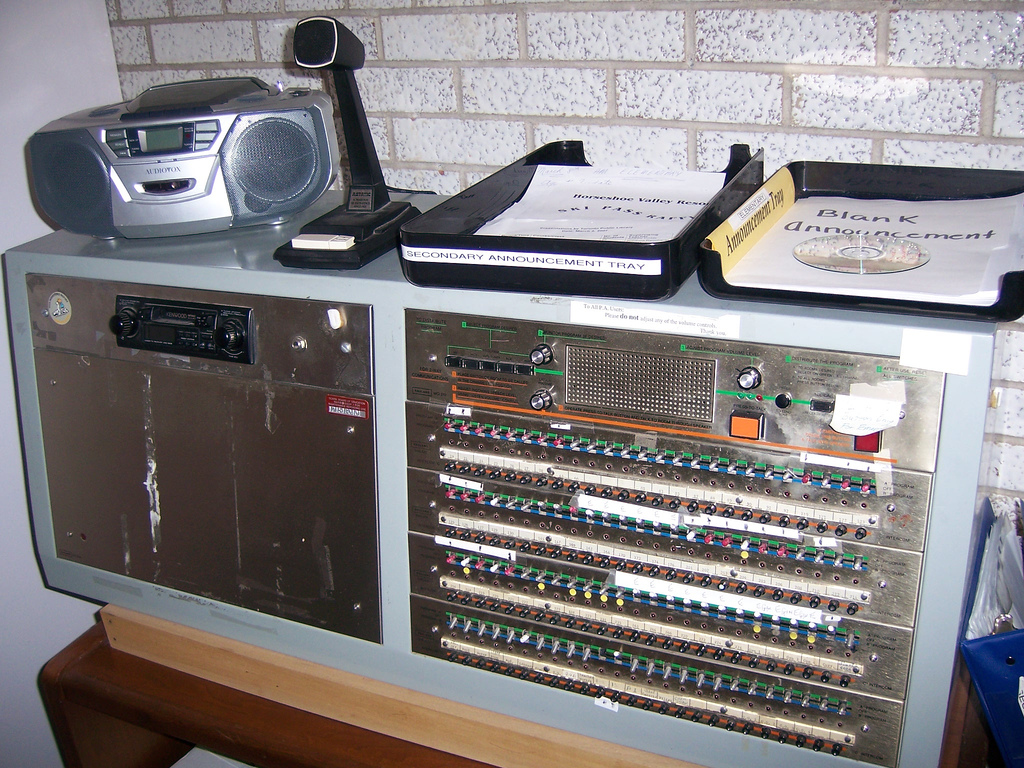
Public address system in an old high school

The simplest, smallest PA systems consist of a microphone, an amplifier, and one or more loudspeakers. PA systems of this type, often providing 50 to 200 watts of power, are often used in small venues such as school auditoriums, churches, and coffeehouse stages. Small PA systems may extend to an entire building, such as a restaurant, store, elementary school or office building. A sound source such as a compact disc player or radio may be connected to a PA system so that music can be played through the system. Smaller, battery-powered 12 volt systems may be installed in vehicles such as tour buses or school buses, so that the tour guide and/or driver can speak to all the passengers. Portable systems may be battery-powered and/or powered by plugging the system into an electric wall socket. These may also be used by people addressing smaller groups such as information sessions or team meetings. Battery-powered systems can be used by guides who are speaking to clients on walking tours.

Public address systems consist of input sources (microphones, sound playback devices, etc.), amplifiers, control and monitoring equipment (e.g., LED indicator lights, VU meters, headphones), and loudspeakers. Usual inputs include microphones for speech or singing, direct inputs from musical instruments, and a recorded sound playback device. In non-performance applications, there may be a system that operators or automated equipment uses to select from a number of standard prerecorded messages. These input sources feed into preamplifiers and signal routers that direct the audio signal to selected zones of a facility (e.g., only to one section of a school). The preamplified signals then pass into the amplifiers. Depending on local practices, these amplifiers usually amplify the audio signals to 50 V, 70 V, or 100 V speaker line level. Control equipment monitors the amplifiers and speaker lines for faults before it reaches the loudspeakers. This control equipment is also used to separate zones in a PA system. The loudspeaker converts electrical signals into sound.

== Large systems ==
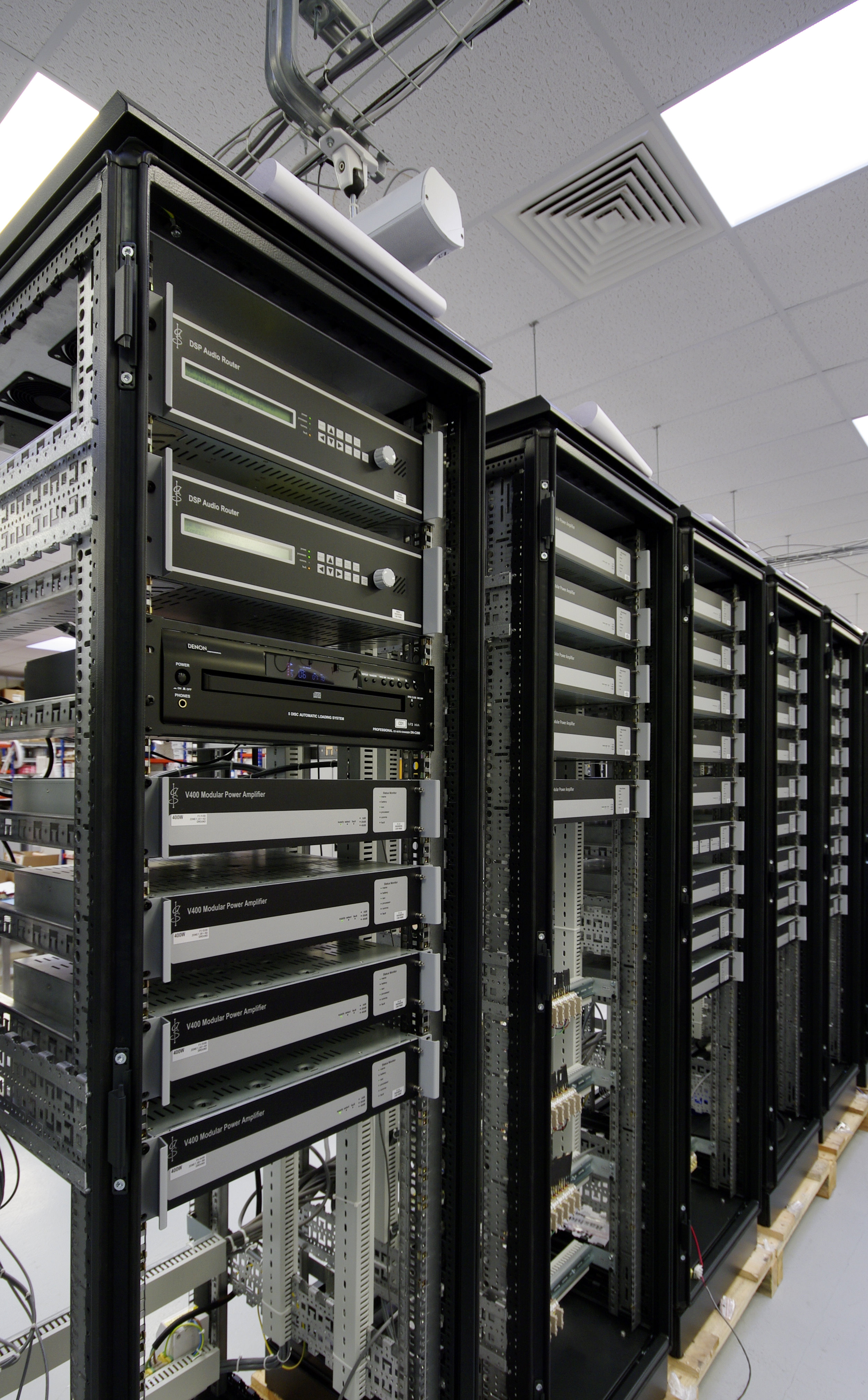
Public address system consisting of amplifiers, mixers, and routers for Gatwick Airport in London.

Some PA systems have speakers that cover more than one building, extending to an entire campus of a college, office or industrial site, or an entire outdoor complex (e.g., an athletic stadium). A large PA system may also be used as an alert system during an emergency.

PA systems by size and subwoofer approach

PA system set-up	Venue size
Small system: 2 pole-mounted mid/high frequency PA speaker cabinets and 2 small subwoofer cabinets with 15" or 18" subwoofers (this would be used in a club where jazz, acoustic music, country music or soft rock is played)	Small club with capacity for up to 300 people
Small high amplifier power system: 2 high amplifier power-rated mid/high frequency PA speakers with 15" woofers and a large horn-loaded tweeter; two high amplifier power-rated subwoofer cabinets with one or two 18" subwoofer cabs (front-firing, also known as "front loaded", or manifold-loaded subwoofer cabinets)	Small club with capacity for up to 500 people
Mid-size PA system: 4 larger multi-woofer mid/high frequency PA speaker cabs (e.g., each with two 15" woofers) and four subwoofer cabinets, either front-firing, manifold-loaded or a folded horn	Large clubs with capacity for 500+ people, small music festivals, fairs
Large-size PA system: Multiple mid/high frequency PA speakers, possibly "flown" up high in rigging, and a number of subwoofer cabinets (either front firing, manifold loaded or folded horn)	Large venues with capacity for 1000+ people, larger music festivals

== Telephone paging systems ==
Some private branch exchange (PBX) telephone systems use a paging facility that acts as a liaison between the telephone and a PA amplifier. In other systems, paging equipment is not built into the telephone system. Instead the system includes a separate paging controller connected to a trunk port of the telephone system. The paging controller is accessed as either a designated directory number or central office line. In many modern systems, the paging function is integrated into the telephone system, so the system can send announcements to the phone speakers.

Many retailers and offices choose to use the telephone system as the sole access point for the paging system, because the features are integrated. Many schools and other larger institutions are no longer using the large, bulky microphone PA systems and have switched to telephone system paging, as it can be accessed from many different points in the school.

== PA over IP ==
PA over IP are PA paging and intercom systems that use an Internet Protocol (IP) network, instead of a central amplifier, to distribute the audio signal to paging locations across a building or campus, or anywhere else in the reach of the IP network, including the Internet. Network-attached amplifiers and intercom units are used to provide the communication function. At the transmission end, a computer application transmits a digital audio stream via the local area network, using audio from the computer's sound card inputs or from stored audio recordings. At the receiving end, either specialized intercom modules (sometimes known as IP speakers) receive these network transmissions and reproduce the analog audio signal. These are small, specialized network appliances addressable by an IP address, just like any other computer on the network.

== 2-way radio wireless PA ==
A 2-way radio wireless PA receiver and horn speaker is designed to facilitate the direct delivery of voice messages from a base station or mobile 2-way radio to a PA speaker located at distances that can measure in miles. The receiver and PA speaker combination is ideal in situations where traditional hard-wired PA installations are impractical, prohibitively expensive, or temporary. These receivers operate in business-band UHF and VHF 2-way licensed frequency bands, or in the MURS unlicensed frequencies. Installation requires setting the frequency you want to use on both the radio and the PA system, plus powering the wireless PA receivers.

== WMT PA systems ==
Wireless mobile telephony (WMT) PA systems are PA paging and intercom systems that use any form of wireless mobile telephony system such as GSM networks instead of a centralized amplifier to distribute the audio signal to paging locations across a building or campus, or other location. The GSM mobile networks are used to provide the communication function. At the transmission end, a PSTN Telephone, mobile phone, VOIP phone or any other communication device that can access and make audio calls to a GSM-based mobile SIM card can communicate with it. At the receiving end, a GSM transceiver receives these network transmissions and reproduces the analogue audio signal via a Power Amplifier and speaker. This was pioneered by Stephen Robert Pearson of Lancashire, England who was granted patents for the systems, which also incorporate control functionality. Using a WMT (GSM) network means that live announcements can be made to anywhere in the world where there is WMT connectivity. The patents cover all forms of WMT i.e., 2G, 3G, 4G ..... ××G. A UK company called Remvox Ltd (Remote Voice experience) has been appointed under license to develop and manufacture products based on the technology.

== Long line PA ==
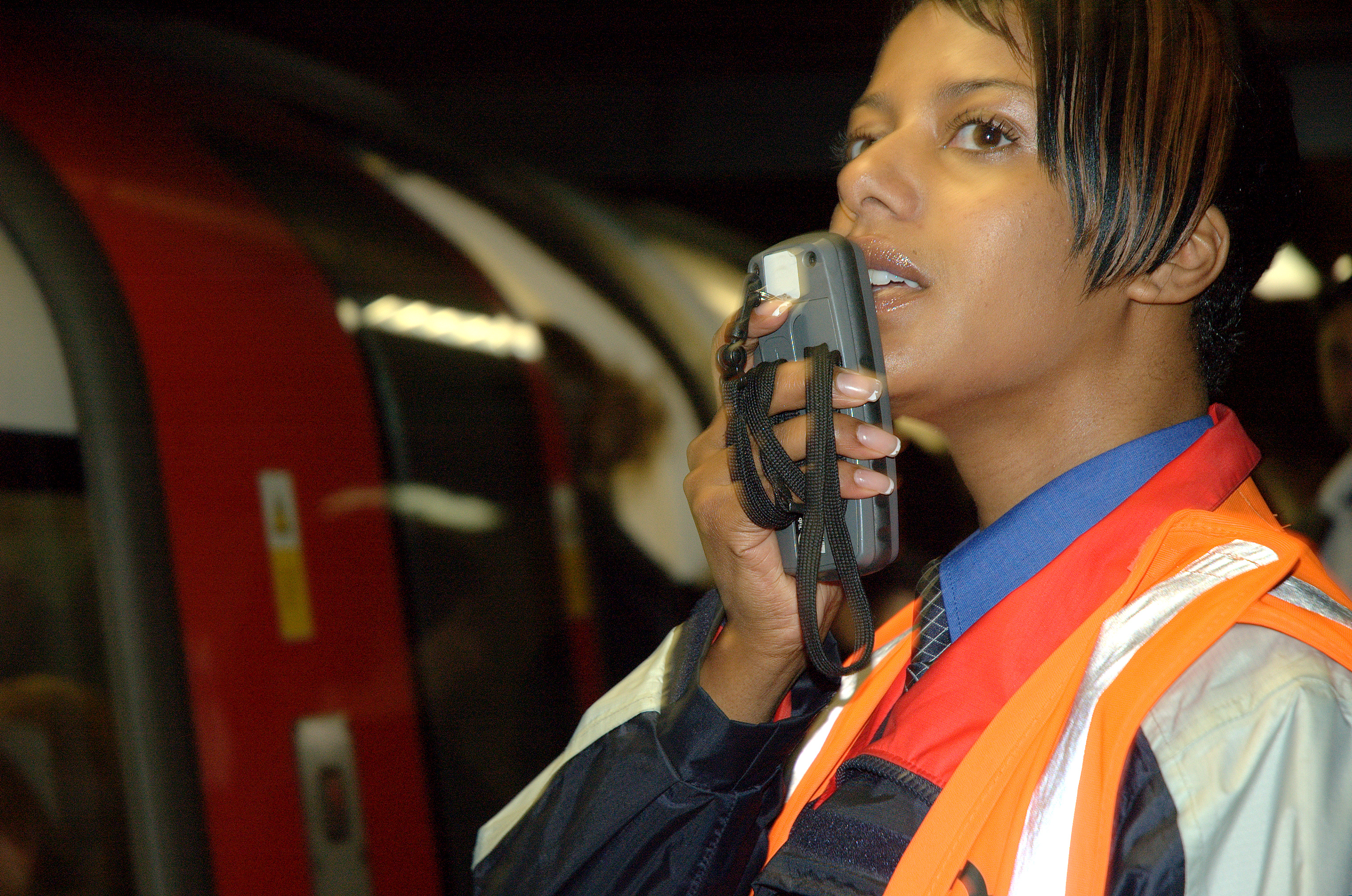
London Underground employee making a Long Line Public Address system announcement using an RPA01 Radio Microphone at Bank station

A Long-Line Public Address (LLPA) system is any public address system with a distributed architecture, normally across a wide geographic area. Systems of this type are commonly found in the rail, light rail, and metro industries, and let announcements be triggered from one or several locations to the rest of the network over low bandwidth legacy copper, normally PSTN lines using DSL modems, or media such as optical fiber, or GSM-R, or IP-based networks.

Rail systems typically have an interface with a passenger information system (PIS) server at each station. These are linked to train describers, which state the location of rolling stock on the network from sensors on trackside signaling equipment. The PIS invokes a stored message to play from a local or remote digital voice announcement system, or a series of message fragments to assemble in the correct order, for example: " / the / 23.30 / Great_Western_Railway / Night_Riviera_sleeper_service / from / London_Paddington / to / Penzance / .... / will depart from platform / one / this train is formed of / 12_carriages /." Messages are routed via an IP network and are played on local amplification equipment. Taken together, the PA, routing, DVA, passenger displays and PIS interface are referred to as the customer information system (CIS), a term often used interchangeably with passenger information system.

== Small venue systems ==
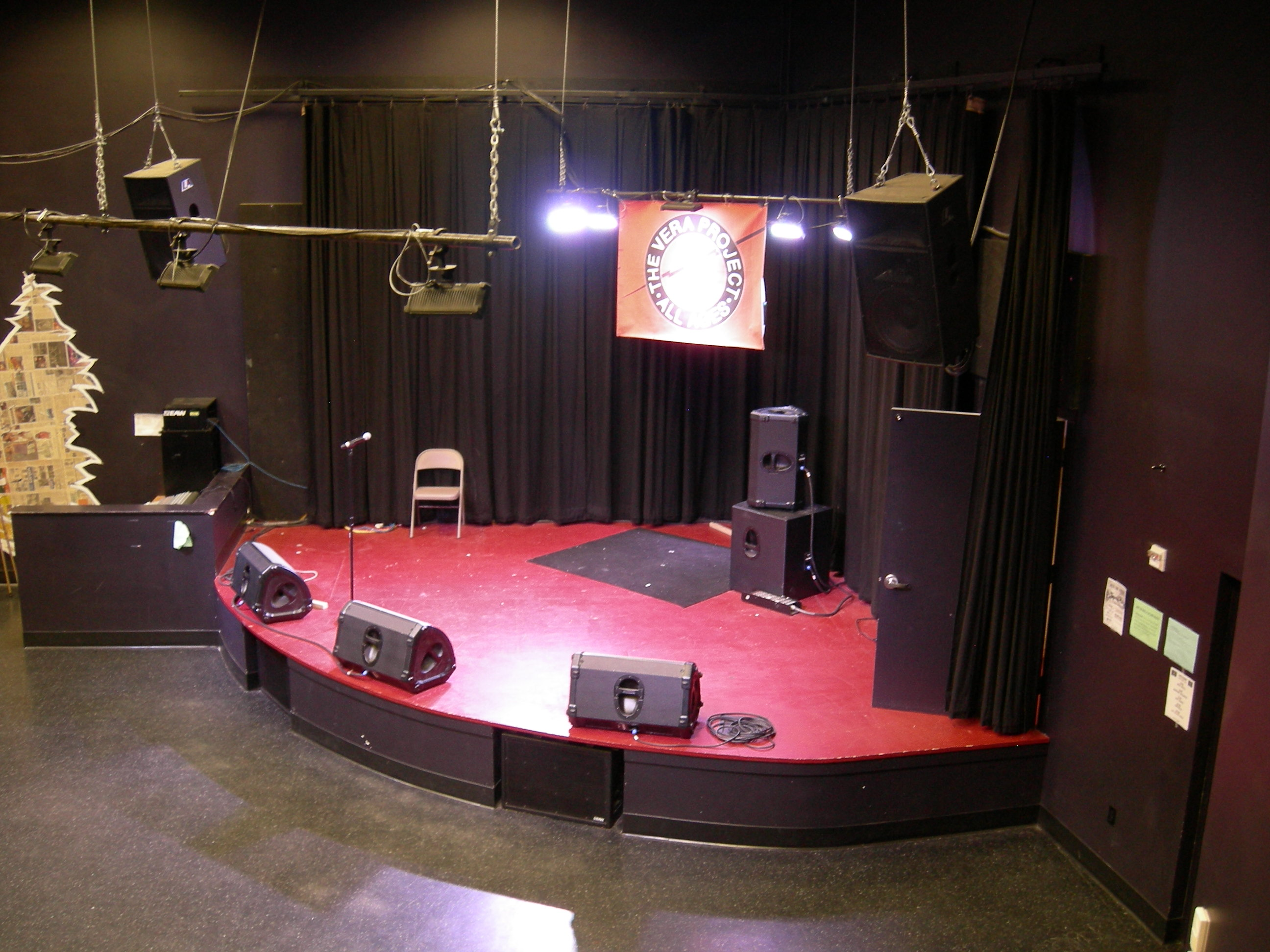
This small venue's stage shows a typical PA system.

Small clubs, bars and coffeehouses use a fairly simple set-up, with front of house speaker cabinets (and subwoofers, in some cases) aimed at the audience, and monitor speaker cabinets aimed back at the performers so they can hear their vocals and instruments. In many cases, front of house speakers are elevated, either by mounting them on poles or by "flying" them from anchors in the ceiling. The Front of House speakers are elevated to prevent the sound from being absorbed by the first few rows of audience members. The subwoofers do not need to be elevated, because deep bass is omnidirectional. In the smallest coffeehouses and bars, the audio mixer may be onstage so that the performers can mix their own sound levels. In larger bars, the audio mixer may be located in or behind the audience seating area, so that an audio engineer can listen to the mix and adjust the sound levels. The adjustments to the monitor speaker mix may be made by a single audio engineer using the main mixing board, or they may be made by a second audio engineer who uses a separate mixing board.

== Large venue systems ==
For popular music concerts, a more powerful and more complicated PA System is used to provide live sound reproduction. In a concert setting, there are typically two complete PA systems: the "main" system and the "monitor" system. Each system consists of a mixing board, sound processing equipment, amplifiers, and speakers. The microphones that are used to pick up vocals and amplifier sounds are routed through both the main and monitor systems. Audio engineers can set different sound levels for each microphone on the main and monitor systems. For example, a backup vocalist whose voice has a low sound level in the main mix may ask for a much louder sound level through their monitor speaker, so they can hear their singing.

- The "main" system (also known as Front of House, commonly abbreviated FOH), which provides the amplified sound for the audience, typically uses a number of powerful amplifiers that drive a range of large, heavy-duty loudspeakers—including low-frequency speaker cabinets called subwoofers, full-range speaker cabinets, and high-range horns. A large club may use amplifiers to provide 3000 to 5000 watts of power to the "main" speakers. An outdoor concert may use 10,000 or more watts.
- The monitor system reproduces the sounds of the performance and directs them towards the onstage performers (typically using wedge-shaped monitor speaker cabinets), to help them to hear the instruments and vocals. In British English, the monitor system is referred to as the "foldback". The monitor system in a large club may provide 500 to 1000 watts of power to several foldback speakers; at an outdoor concert, there may be several thousand watts of power going to the monitor system.

At a concert using live sound reproduction, sound engineers and technicians control the mixing boards for the "main" and "monitor" systems, adjusting tone, levels, and overall volume.

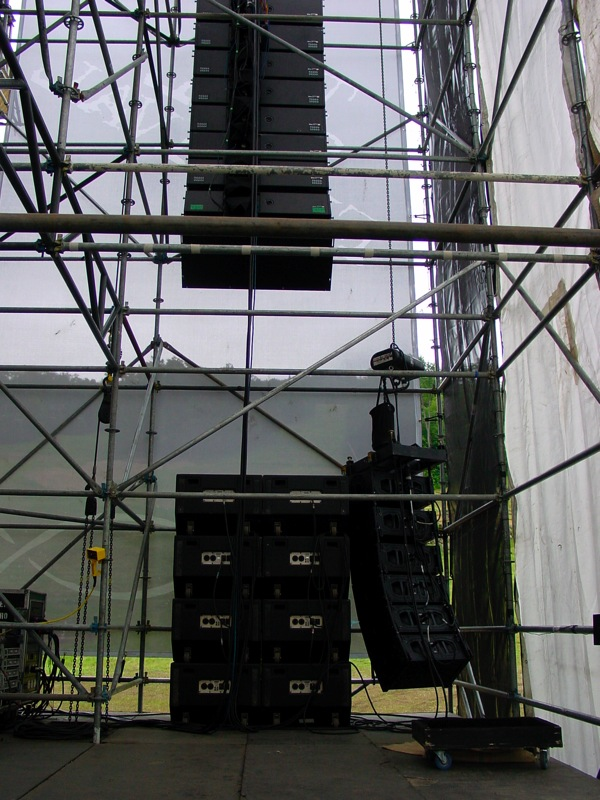
A line array speaker system and subwoofer cabinets at a live music concert

Touring productions travel with relocatable large line-array PA systems, sometimes rented from an audio equipment hire company. The sound equipment moves from venue to venue along with various other equipment such as lighting and projection.

=== Voice alarm and emergency use ===
When a public address system is used to broadcast emergency or evacuation messages it forms part of a voice alarm (or voice evacuation) system and is subject to speech-intelligibility requirements. In Europe the control and indicating equipment for such systems is covered by EN 54-16, and the intelligibility of the installed system is typically verified by measuring the Speech Transmission Index, most often using the simplified STIPA method defined in IEC 60268-16.

== Acoustic feedback ==
All PA systems have the potential for audio feedback, which occurs when a microphone picks up sound from the speakers, which is re-amplified and sent through the speakers again. It often sounds like a loud high-pitched squeal or screech, and can occur when the volume of the system is turned up too high. Feedback only occurs when the loop gain of the feedback loop is greater than one, so it can always be stopped by reducing the volume sufficiently.

Sound engineers take several steps to maximize gain before feedback, including keeping microphones at a distance from speakers, ensuring that directional microphones are not pointed towards speakers, keeping the onstage volume levels down, and lowering gain levels at frequencies where the feedback is occurring, using a graphic equalizer, a parametric equalizer, or a notch filter. Some 2010s-era mixing consoles and effects units have automatic feedback-preventing circuits.

Feedback prevention devices detect the start of unwanted feedback and use a precise notch filter to lower the gain of the frequencies that are feeding back. Some automated feedback detectors require the user to "set" the feedback-prone frequencies by purposely increasing gain (during a sound check) until some feedback starts to occur. This process is often referred to as "a ring out" or "an EQ" of a room/venue. The device then retains these frequencies in its memory and it stands by ready to cut them. Some automated feedback prevention devices can detect and reduce new frequencies other than those found in the sound check.

== See also ==
- Announcer
- Instrument amplifier
- 1 Main Circuit, the shipwide public address system on United States ships
