= Danielle Rowe =

- Born: 1982 (age 43–44); Shepparton, Australia
- Occupations: Ballet dancer, choreographer
- Spouse: Luke Ingham
- Children: 2
- Dancing career
- Former groups: Houston Ballet, The Australian Ballet, Nederlands Dans Theater

Danielle Rowe (born 1982 in Shepparton) is an Australian-born ballet dancer and choreographer. She is the artistic director of Oregon Ballet Theatre.

== Dancing career ==
Rowe trained in Newcastle and Adelaide. She joined The Australian Ballet in 2001. She won the Telstra People's Choice Award in both 2003 and 2005 and in 2008 became a principal artist with the company.

In 2011, she joined the Houston Ballet as a first soloist (senior artist in Australian Ballet terms). and was promoted to principal dancer in August of the same year. In 2012 she joined Nederlands Dans Theater.

== Choreography career ==
In 2017, Rowe, who had retired from dancing, choreographed her first piece. This was For Pixie for SFDanceworks, where she became the associate artistic director. The piece is inspired by her grandparents, and has since been performed by San Francisco Ballet and Ballet Idaho.

Rowe's ballet Fury, inspired by the film Mad Max: Fury Road, premiered in San Francisco in September 2018. The work was produced by Kate Duhamel and featured dancers from LINES Ballet and San Francisco Ballet, including Adji Cissoko, Babatunji, Frances Chung, Dores André, and Rowe's husband Luke Ingham. Fury was later performed in San Jose at the Silicon Valley Comic Con, Oakland, and also returned to San Francisco.

After seeing For Pixie, Helgi Tomasson, artistic director of San Francisco Ballet, hired her to choreograph a piece, UnSaid, for San Francisco's 2019 opening gala. Her first ensemble piece for the company, Wooden Dimes, starring Sarah Van Patten, premiered in March 2021 in a digital program due to the COVID-19 pandemic. Madcap, starring principal dancer Tiit Helimets as a clown having a personal crisis, premiered January 20, 2023 with San Francisco Ballet at the War Memorial Opera House.

In 2023, she became the artistic director of Oregon Ballet Theatre

== Awards ==
In 2009, Rowe won the Walter Bourke prize, which allowed her to travel to New York and perform with Christopher Wheeldon's dance company Morphoses. In 2010, she won a Helpmann Award for her performance in Dyad 1929 by Wayne McGregor.

In 2012, Rowe was named one of "25 to Watch" by Dance Magazine.

== Personal life ==
Rowe is married to fellow South Australian Luke Ingham. Ingham also danced with Houston Ballet for the 2011–2012 season. In 2012, he joined San Francisco Ballet where he was promoted to principal dancer in 2014. Rowe joined him in San Francisco, and they married at City Hall. They have two children.
