= Adji Cissoko =

German ballet dancer

- Born: Munich, Germany
- Education: School of American Ballet, Jacqueline Kennedy Onassis School
- Occupation: Ballet dancer
- Height: 5 ft 10 in (178 cm)
- Career
- Current group: Alonzo King LINES Ballet
- Former groups: National Ballet of Canada

Adji Cissoko is a German ballet dancer. She is currently a principal dancer at LINES Ballet.

== Early life ==
Cissoko was born in Munich, Germany, to a German mother and Senegalese father. While growing up, the family visited Senegal regularly and blended both cultures at home. While growing up, she studied the Vaganova method of ballet training. At age 18, she left Germany to study at School of American Ballet and American Ballet Theatre's Jacqueline Kennedy Onassis School, both in New York.

== Career ==
After graduating, Cissoko joined the corps de ballet at the National Ballet of Canada. The artistic director, Karen Kain, had seen her dance at the 2009 Prix de Lausanne. During her first year with the ballet, she was photographed for the cover of the August/September 2011 issue of Pointe Magazine. After three seasons with the National Ballet of Canada, Cissoko felt she wasn't a good fit for the company because of her height, and Kain suggested she try out for LINES Ballet, a more contemporary company with taller dancers. Cissoko was accepted at LINES, although she did return to National Ballet of Canada in summer 2018 to dance Swan Lake.

Cissoko has danced with LINES since 2014, where founder Alonzo King encouraged her to be more improvisational. She has also performed at New Chamber Ballet and Monterrey International Ballet Gala. In 2018, she created the role of Furiosa in Fury, a ballet based on Mad Max: Fury Road choreographed by Danielle Rowe and produced by Kate Duhamel.

== Personal life ==
Cissoko also started working as a life coach during the COVID-19 pandemic, which she spent in Toronto. She is fluent in German, French, and English, conversational in Spanish, and knows basic Wolof.
