= Border Gateway Multicast Protocol =

The Border Gateway Multicast Protocol (BGMP) was an IETF project which attempted to design a true inter-domain multicast routing protocol. BGMP was planned to be able to scale in order to operate in the global Internet.
