= Forward Networks =

American technology company

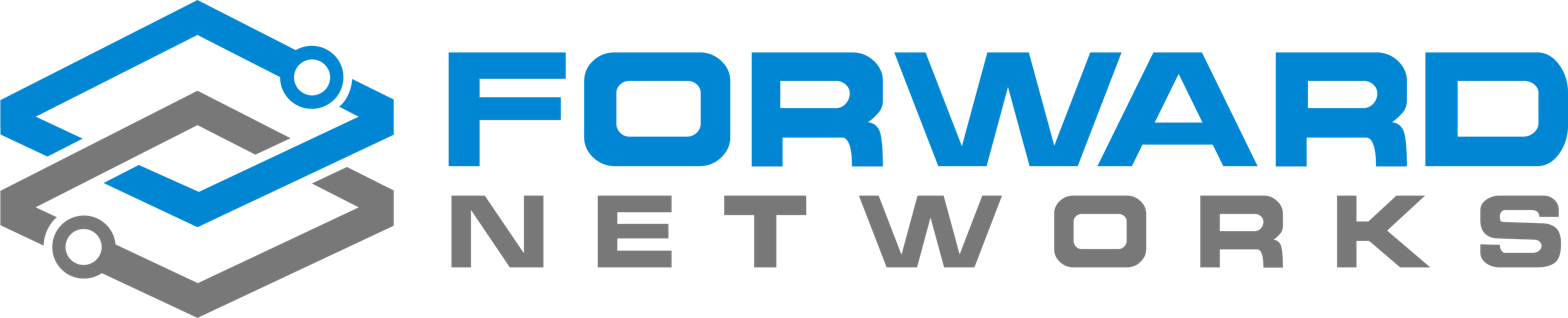
- Industry: Computer software
- Founded: July 23, 2013
- Founder: David Erickson, Nikhil Handigol, Brandon Heller, Peyman Kazemian
- Headquarters: Santa Clara, California
- Website: https://www.forwardnetworks.com/

Forward Networks, Inc. is an American company founded in Palo Alto, California and headquartered in Santa Clara, California. The company develops enterprise software for network management and software-defined networking.

== History ==
Forward Networks was founded by David Erickson, Nikhil Handigol, Brandon Heller, and Peyman Kazemian, who met as Ph.D researchers at Stanford University. While operating software-defined networking deployments running OpenFlow at the university, Erickson, Handigol, Heller, and Kazemian built a software platform based on Kazemian's research at Stanford for his electrical engineering dissertation. Kazemian's research enabled the use of configuration data and operational state information from devices on a network to create a virtual copy of that network.

Until November 2016, the company operated in stealth mode and raised $16 million in funding by DFJ, with participation from Andreesen Horowitz.

In October 2019 the company raised $35 million in Series C funding led by Goldman Sachs, also a customer of the company.

In January 2023, following 139% year-over-year growth, Forward Networks announced it closed $50M in Series D funding. The round was led by MSD Partners with support from new investors, Section 32 and Omega Venture Partners.

Forward Networks' other customers include PayPal, Ubisoft, and Telstra.

== Intent-based networking ==
Intent-based networking (IBN), a term coined by Gartner in 2017 describes a system designed to automate a network lifecycle from design and implementation to deployment and validation.

Forward Networks' technology focuses on verification with regards to intent-based networking. The platform generates a mathematical model of the network to perform functions such as composing timestamped collections of network configurations and state information of a network infrastructure. The product is marketed as a network assurance platform called Forward Enterprise.

== See also ==
- SolarWinds
- Infoblox
- Red Hat
