= Céline Cassone =

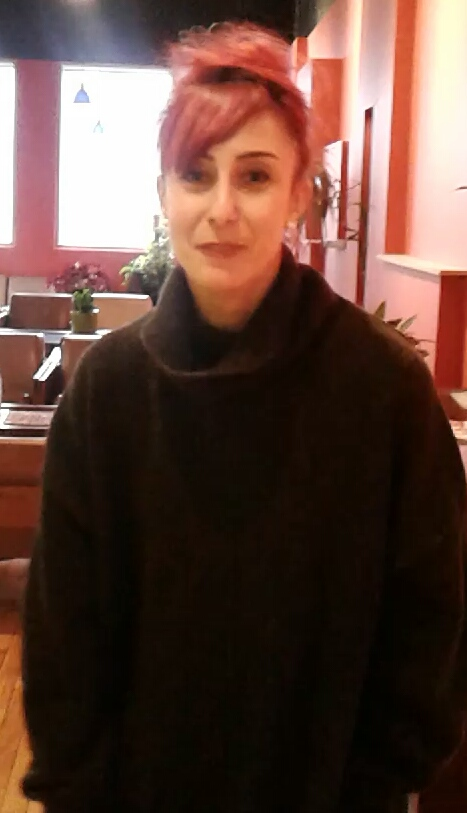
Céline Cassone.jpg

Céline Cassone is a French-born ballerina dancing with the Morphoses/The Wheeldon Company and Benjamin Millepied's Danses Concertantes (Note: Village Voice by Deborah Jowitt, December 12, 2008) at the Joyce Theater during their 2008 seasons. She at the Conservatoire National d’Avignon and began her dance career at the Deutsche Oper Berlin. She later joined the State Theater of Karlsruhe and for four danced in Germinal Casado's ballets. Céline then joined the Béjart Ballet and in 1999 the Ballet du Grand Théâtre de Genève where she was promoted to soloist.
