= Data center interconnect =

Connection between data center buildings

A data center interconnect (DCI) is a connection between data centers and between the components within them. The goal of a data center interconnect is to provide high bandwidth in order to maximize the utility of the data center. Inter data center interconnects must also be able to transmit over long distances. By using specialized infrastructure such as optical communication and direct connection between data centers, DCI is able to provide much higher bandwidths than typical networks. This is valuable to large cloud computing companies. In 2017, IEEE standards were created to support 400 GbE per wavelength optical communications. For short range connections within a data center, optical DCI can provide the advantage over traditional DCI of not needing cables.
