= Inter-domain routing =

Inter-domain routing is data flow control and interaction between Primary Domain Controller (PDC) computers. This type of computer uses various computer protocols and services to operate. It is most commonly used to multicast between internet domains.

== Internet use ==
An Internet service provider, ISP, is provided with a unique URL access address. This address is a unique number. The number for each ISP is stored within a DNS server. The DNS servers interpret the ISP URL Domain name and provide the appropriate IP address number. The Domain is under the control of a specialized computer, called a PDC, (primary domain controller). This computer holds records of all the user accounts within the domain, their rights to access information, and lists of approved System Operatives. This PDC is backed up by an SDC, (a secondary domain controller), this computer synchronises itself with the PDC and takes over the role in the event of a PDC failure. Multiple replication servers connect to these control computers and they are routed to the Internet backbone to provide the requested data to and from the domain.

=== Communication protocols ===
Internet protocols that are focused on inter-domain functions include: Border Gateway Multicast Protocol, Classless Inter-Domain Routing, Multicast Source Discovery Protocol, and Protocol Independent Multicast.

=== Services ===
A PDC uses a number of special computer programs to announce its presence to other domain controllers. It uses Windows Internet naming service WINS and Browser services to allow other computers to gain access to digital information that it has control over.

=== Other ===
The opposite of inter-domain routing is intra-domain routing, routing within a domain or an autonomous system.

== See also ==
- List of routing protocols
