= List of Morphoses productions =

Morphoses is a ballet company, co-founded in 2007 by Christopher Wheeldon and Lourdes Lopez. Morphoses is a guest resident company at the New York City Center and at Sadler's Wells Theatre in London. It was known as Morphoses/The Wheeldon Company until February 2010, when Wheeldon announced that he was leaving the company.

== Productions ==
=== City Center, October 1–5, 2008 ===
==== program one, October 1–3 ====
===== Polyphonia =====
(Note: NY Times by Roslyn Sulcas, October 2, 2008)

  - Christopher Wheeldon’s choreography
  - Ligeti's eponymous music
  - costumes by Holly Hynes
  - lighting by Mark Stanley

- Wendy Whelan
- Tiler Peck
- Beatriz Stix-Brunell
- Teresa Reichlen

- Tyler Angle
- Gonzalo Garcia
- Craig Hall
- Jason Fowler

===== Monotones II =====
  - Frederick Ashton’s choreography
  - Satie's Trois Gymnopédie
  - costumes and lighting by Ashton

- Maria Kowroski

- Rubinald Pronk
- Edward Watson

===== Commedia =====
(Note: New York City premiere) (Note: Village Voice by Deborah Jowitt, October 7, 2008)

  - Christopher Wheeldon’s choreography
  - Stravinsky’s Pulcinella Suite
  - costumes by Isabel Toledo
  - sets by Ruben Toledo
  - lighting by Penny Jacobus

- Leanne Benjamin
- Beatriz Stix-Brunell
- Céline Cassone
- Drew Jacoby

- Rory Hohenstein
- Edwaard Liang
- Rubinald Pronk
- Edward Watson

===== Six Fold Illuminate =====
(Note: Village Voice by Deborah Jowitt, October 7, 2008)

  - Emily Molnar's choreography
  - Reich's Variations for Winds, Strings and Keyboards
  - costumes by Narciso Rodriguez
  - lighting by Pierre Lavoie

- Drew Jacoby
- Céline Cassone

*Edwaard Liang
- Edward Watson
- Rubinald Pronk
- Rory Hohenstein

==== program two, October 4–5 ====
===== Commedia =====
- Christopher Wheeldon’s choreography
  - Stravinsky’s Pulcinella Suite
  - costumes by Isabel Toledo
  - sets by Ruben Toledo
  - lighting by Penny Jacobus

- Leanne Benjamin
- Beatriz Stix-Brunell
- Céline Cassone
- Drew Jacoby

- Rory Hohenstein
- Edwaard Liang
- Rubinald Pronk
- Edward Watson

===== One =====
(Note: Annabelle Lopez Ochoa's One replaced Sir Frederick Ashton’s The Dream Pas de Deux due to injury.)

- Annabelle Lopez Ochoa's choreography
  - Jacob Ter Vedhuis' music
  - costumes by Benjamin Briones
  - lighting by Lopez Ochoa

- Drew Jacoby

- Rubinald Pronk

===== Monotones II =====
  - Frederick Ashton’s choreography
  - Satie's Trois Gymnopédie
  - costumes and lighting by Ashton

Wendy Whelan

- Tyler Angle
- Adrian Danchig-Waring

===== Shutters Shut =====
  - Lightfoot León's choreography
  - text by Gertrude Stein
  - costumes and lighting by Lightfoot León

- Christine Thomassen (Note: guest artist)

- Andreas Heise

===== Fools’ Paradise =====
- Christopher Wheeldon’s choreography
  - music by Joby Talbot, adapted for string orchestra from his score for the British Film Institute's release of silent film The Dying Swan
  - costumes by Narciso Rodriguez
  - lighting by Penny Jacobus

- Wendy Whelan
- Maria Kowroski
- Teresa Reichlen
- Tiler Peck
- Céline Cassone

- Craig Hall
- Edwaard Liang
- Adrian Danchig-Waring
- Gonzalo Garcia

=== Guggenheim Museum, March 8–9, 2009 ===
==== Commedia ====
  - Christopher Wheeldon’s choreography
  - Stravinsky's music

=== Fall for Dance, September–October 2009 ===
==== Softly as I Leave You ====
  - Lightfoot León’s choreography
  - Pärt and Bach's music

- Drew Jacoby

- Rubinald Pronk

=== City Center, October 29, – November 1, 2009 ===
==== program one, Thursday and Saturday, October 29 and 31 ====
(Note: NY Times review by Gia Kourlas, October 30, 2009) (Note: NY Post review by Leigh Witchel, October 30, 2009)

  - accompanied by the Philharmonic Orchestra of the Americas

===== Commedia =====
  - Christopher Wheeldon’s choreography
  - Stravinsky's music

===== Softly as I Leave You =====
  - Lightfoot León's choreography
  - Pärt and Bach's music

- Drew Jacoby

- Rubinald Pronk

===== Bolero =====
  - Alexei Ratmansky’s choreography
  - Ravel's music

===== new Harbour ballet =====
  - Tim Harbour’s choreography (Note: US premiere)
  - Edwards' music

==== program two, Friday and Sunday, October 30 and November 1 ====
  - all piano program

===== Continuum =====
  - Christopher Wheeldon’s choreography
  - Ligeti's music

===== Softly as I Leave You =====
  - Lightfoot León’s choreography
  - Pärt and Bach's music

===== new Wheeldon ballet =====
  - Christopher Wheeldon’s choreography
  - Rachmaninoff's music

== Dancers ==
=== 2008 New York City Center ===
- Beatriz Stix-Brunell
- Céline Cassone
- Christine Thomassen
- Drew Jacoby
- Leanne Benjamin
- Maria Kowroski
- Teresa Reichlen
- Tiler Peck
- Wendy Whelan

- Adrian Danchig-Waring
- Andreas Heise
- Craig Hall
- Edwaard Liang
- Edward Watson
- Gonzalo Garcia
- Jason Fowler
- Rory Hohenstein
- Rubinald Pronk
- Tyler Angle

=== 2009 Fall for Dance ===
- Drew Jacoby

- Rubinald Pronk

=== 2009 New York City Center ===
- Carrie Lee Riggins
- Danielle Rowe
- Drew Jacoby
- Gabrielle Lamb
- Melissa Barak
- Rachel Sherak
- Wendy Whelan

- Andrew Crawford
- Edwaard Liang
- Juan Pablo Ledo
- Lucas Segovia
- Matthew Prescott
- Rory Hohenstein
- Rubinald Pronk
- Ty Gurfein

== Reviews ==
- Village Voice by Deborah Jowitt, November 10, 2009
- Sulcas, Roslyn, 2009, "New Troupe Faces a Hard Reality," International Herald Tribune, October 24–25, pp. 15 & 19.
