= Rubinald Pronk =

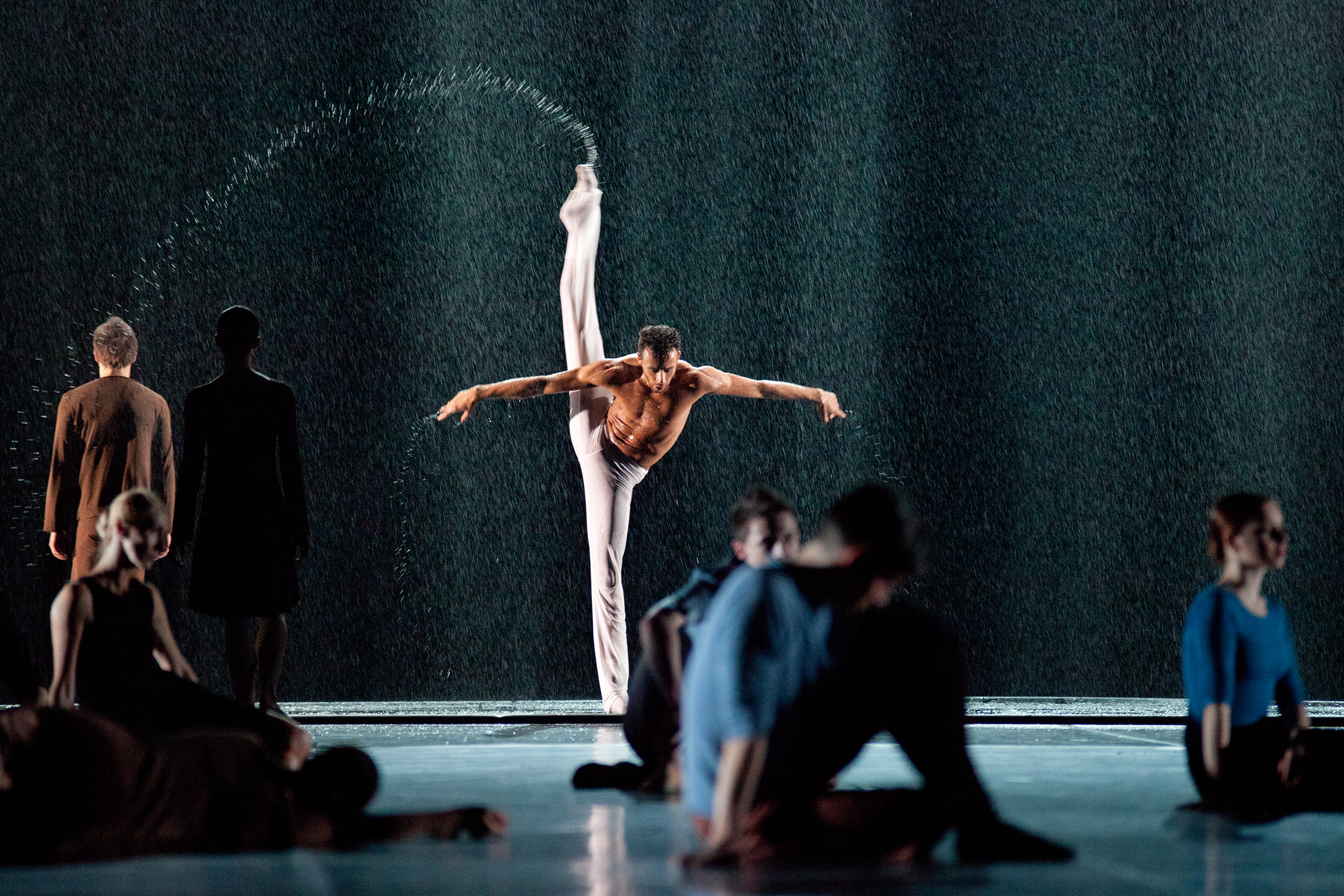
Rubi Pronk in And the Rain Will Pass… by Krzysztof Pastor, Polish National Ballet, Warsaw 2011. Photo: Ewa Krasucka

Rubinald Rofino Pronk (born 17 July ), born and raised in The Hague, Netherlands, is a danseur performing with the Morphoses/The Wheeldon Company.

== Training and Career ==
He trained at the Royal (Dutch) Conservatory of Dance and joined the Dutch National Ballet at the age of 16 and was promoted to soloist. Rubinald performed works by choreographers including Sir Frederick Ashton, George Balanchine, William Forsythe, Jacopo Godani, Martha Graham and Krzysztof Pastor. In 2006 he joined Dwight Rhoden and Desmond Richardson's Complexions Contemporary Ballet, performing works by Rhoden and Ulysses Dove. He is a guest artist with the Dutch National Ballet and in between 2009 and 2011 with the Polish National Ballet.
