= Network loudspeaker =

Loudspeaker connected to a computer network

A conventional loudspeaker is an electromechanical transducer that converts an electrical signal into sound. If locally powered, this can also be termed an active loudspeaker, meaning it contains an audio power amplifier that drives the loudspeaker. A network loudspeaker implies the ability to send audio to such a device from a network connection, usually over an Ethernet network or the Internet. In many cases this type of speaker also contains digital signal processing (DSP) to provide the audio crossover and other tonal functions that exist in conventional speakers. Network speakers are also known as IP speakers. In many cases the IP speaker is created from an IP audio endpoint — a device with the requisite network connection and ability to process audio packets, but without the actual physical speaker portion — that provides amplified audio to a conventional loudspeaker or unamplified audio (i.e. line-out) to an amplified speaker or system.

== History ==
Network audio was first introduced in 1983 by John Detreville and W. David Sincoskie of Bell Labs in the IEEE paper "A Distributed Experimental Communications System". Subsequently, in 1988, Polle T. Zellweger, Douglas B. Terry and Daniel C. Swinehart of Xerox PARC introduced audio over Ethernet at the 2nd IEEE Conference in a paper entitled "An Overview of the Etherphone System and its Applications". The very closely related technology (nearly synonymous), Voice over IP (VoIP), which generally consists at a minimum of a microphone on one end, a speaker on the other end, with a network connecting them; began widespread use in 1998 with PCs, followed shortly after by dedicated hardware (phones with built-in VoIP capabilities). Subsequently, the first Squeezebox, using networked audio, was released in 2001 and Philips released its IP audio device also in 2001, the FW-i1000. Countless IP audio devices have since proliferated into most major audio markets.

== Designs ==
IP Multicast

IP Unicast

The audio content played by the processor in an IP speaker is communicated from its source across a packet-switched data network using IPv4 and IPv6 addressing with a User Datagram Protocol (UDP) or Real-time Transport Protocol (RTP). The IP Speaker connects to Unicast or Multicast addresses to enable the delivery of streamed data from a source on the network, to arrive at a single speaker or many speakers respectively.

== See also ==
- Audio over IP
