= Alonzo King LINES Ballet =

American contemporary ballet company

Alonzo King LINES Ballet (AKLB)
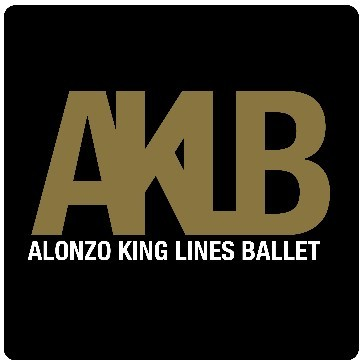

General information
- Name: Alonzo King LINES Ballet (AKLB)
- Previous names: LINES Ballet
- Year founded: 1982
- Founders: Alonzo King; Robert Rosenwasser; Pam Hagen
- Founding choreographers: Alonzo King
- Principal venue: Yerba Buena Center for the Arts, San Francisco, CA
- Website: https://www.linesballet.org

Senior staff
- Chief executive: Robert Rosenwasser

Artistic staff
- Artistic director: Alonzo King
- Ballet master in chief: Laura O’Malley

Other
- Official school: Alonzo King LINES Ballet Training Program
- Associated schools: Alonzo King LINES Ballet BFA at Dominican University of California Alonzo King LINES Ballet Summer Program Alonzo King LINES Ballet Discovery Project LINES Community Programs (HeART with LINES, Kids @LINES, Teens @LINES)

The Alonzo King LINES Ballet (AKLB) is an American contemporary ballet company based in the San Francisco Bay Area. The ballet company, founded by choreographer Alonzo King, premiered at San Francisco State University's McKenna Theatre in 1982.

== Background ==
LINES Ballet performs its home season at the Yerba Buena Center for the Arts in San Francisco while also maintaining an international touring schedule that includes featured performances at venues such as Venice Biennale in Venice, Théâtre National de Chaillot in Paris, and The Kwai Tsing Theatre in Hong Kong. LINES Ballet, which celebrated its 40th-anniversary season in 2022, features a diverse lineup of dancers from countries including Germany, Canada, France, Mexico, and The United States; and presents programs that exemplify the company's artistic vision to renew and transcend traditional ballet with cross-genre collaborations.

== Collaboration ==
Since its inception, LINES Ballet founder Alonzo King has collaborated with artists of various backgrounds including composers, musicians, vocalists, and visual artists to develop new ballet programs for the company.

== Dancers ==
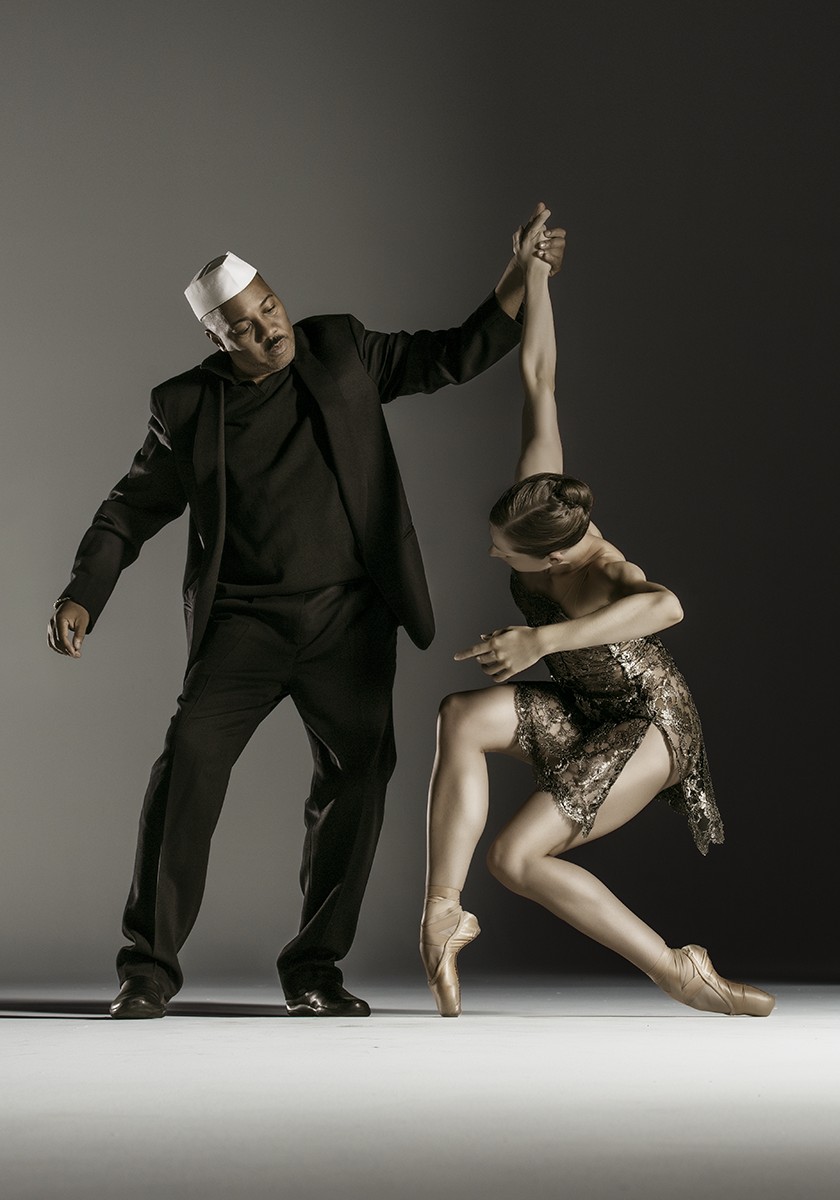
LINES Ballet founder Alonzo King with dancer Laurel Keen, 2014

The listing of dancers currently performing with Alonzo King LINES Ballet as of Spring 2022:

- Babatunji Johnson
- Adji Cissoko
- Madeline DeVries
- Lorris Eichinger
- Shuaib Elhassan
- James Gowan
- Ilaria Guerra
- Maya Harr
- Tatum Quiñónez
- Michael Montgomery
- Alvaro Montelongo
- Marusya Madubuko
- Joshua Francique

=== Notable former dancers ===
- Aesha Ash
- Drew Jacoby
- Laurel Keen
- Maurya Kerr
- Meredith Webster
- Courtney Henry
- Summer Lee Rhatigan

== Repertoire ==
A listing of current and former Alonzo King LINES Ballet programs and collaborative works:

- 2022: Deep River
- 2019: Pole Star & The Personal Element & AZOTH
- 2018: Sutra & Common Ground
- 2017: Figures of Speech
- 2016: Art Songs & SAND
- 2015: The Propelled Heart & Biophony
- 2014: Shostakovich & The Steady Heart
- 2013: Concerto for Two Violins, Meyer, & AZIMUTH
- 2012: Constellation
- 2011: Resin, Figures of Thought, & Triangle of the Squinches
- 2010: Writing Ground & Wheel in the Middle of the Field
- 2009: Scheherazade, Refraction, & Dust and Light
- 2008: The Radius of Convergence, The Steady Articulation of Perseverance
- 2007: Rasa, Irregular Pearl, & Long River, High Sky
- 2006: Sky Clad & Migration
- 2005: The Moroccan Project, Handel, Salt, Odd Fellow, & Satoh
- 2004: Before the Blues, Rite of Spring, Baker Fix, Coleman Hawkins, & The Patience of Aridity, Waiting for Petrichor
- 2003: Heart Song & Syzmanski's Vibraphone Quartet
- 2002: Road, Splash, & Koto
- 2001: The People of the Forest & The Heart's Natural Inclination
- 2000: Soothing the Enemy, Riley, Tango, & In to Get Out
- 1999: Shostakovich String Quartet
- 1998: Who Dressed You Like a Foreigner?, Tarab, & Long Straight Line
- 1997: String Trio, Suite Etta, Three Stops On the Way Home, & Handel Trio
- 1996: Klang, Sacred Text, Handel Pas de Deux, & Ground
- 1995: Signs and Wonders, Rock, & String Quartet
- 1994: Poulenc Pas de Deux, Ocean, & Along the Path
- 1993: Bach Cello Suite, Compelling Geological Evidence, & Pavane
- 1992: Gurdjieff Piano Music
- 1991: Song of the Aka & Cante
- 1990: Without Wax & Toccatta in D Minor
- 1989: Lila & Fallen Angel
- 1988: Awake in the Dream, Ligeti Variations, & Reoccurrence
- 1987: Rain Dreaming & Granados Pas de Deux
- 1986: Prayer & Stealing Light
- 1983: Ictus
- 1982: Danse Poulenc, Christine, & Sonata for Three Dancers

== Collaborators ==
A listing of current and former Alonzo King LINES Ballet program collaborators:

=== Composers, Dancers, Musicians, Performers, and Artists ===
- Vân-Ánh Vanessa Võ - Composer, Musician
- Kronos Quartet - String Quartet
- Zakir Hussain and Sabir Khan - Musicians
- Bob Holman - Poet
- Lisa Fischer - Vocalist
- Charles Lloyd - Musician
- El Hamideen - Musician
- Jean-Cristophe (JC) Maillard - Composer, Arranger, Musician
- San Francisco Opera Adler Fellows - Vocalists
- Melody of China - Music Ensemble
- BaAka Nzamba Lela - Musician
- Maya Lahyani - Vocalist
- Miguel Frasconi - Composer
- Hamza El Din - Composer
- Mickey Hart - Musician
- Zakir Hussain - Musician
- Miya Masaoka - Composer, Musician
- Jason Moran - Musician
- San Francisco's Philharmonia Baroque Orchestra - Music Ensemble
- Edgar Meyer - Musician
- Bernice Johnson Reagon - Composer, Vocalist
- Rita Sahai - Vocalist, Musician
- Pharoah Sanders - Musician
- Somei Satoh - Composer
- Leslie Stuck - Composer
- Paweł Szymański - Composer
- Danny Glover - Actor
- Jim McKee - Sound Designer
- Richard Blackford - Composer
- Bernie Krause - Musician, Bioacoustician
- Arturo Fernandez - Choreographer, Dancer, Ballet Master
- Meredith Webster - Choreographer, Dancer, Ballet Master

=== Visual Artists ===
- Christopher Haas - Architect
- Irene Pijoan - Visual Artist
- Raymond Saunders - Visual Artist
- Alain Lortie - Lighting Designer
- Axel Morgenthaler - Lighting Designer
- Lisa J. Pinkham - Lighting Designer
- David Finn - Lighting Designer
- James F. Ingalls - Lighting Design
- Colleen Quen - Costume Designer
- Robert Wierzel - Lighting Designer
- Sandra Woodall - Costume Designer
- Jim Campbell - Visual Artist
- Jim Doyle - Water Specialist
- Dikayl Rimmasch - Photographer
- Marty Sohl - Photographer
- Angela Sterling - Photographer
- RJ Muna - Photographer
- Franck Thibault - Photographer
- Quinn Wharton -Photographer
- Austin Forbord - Videographer
- Jamie Lyons - Photographer/Videographer
