= Alonzo King =

American dancer and choreographer

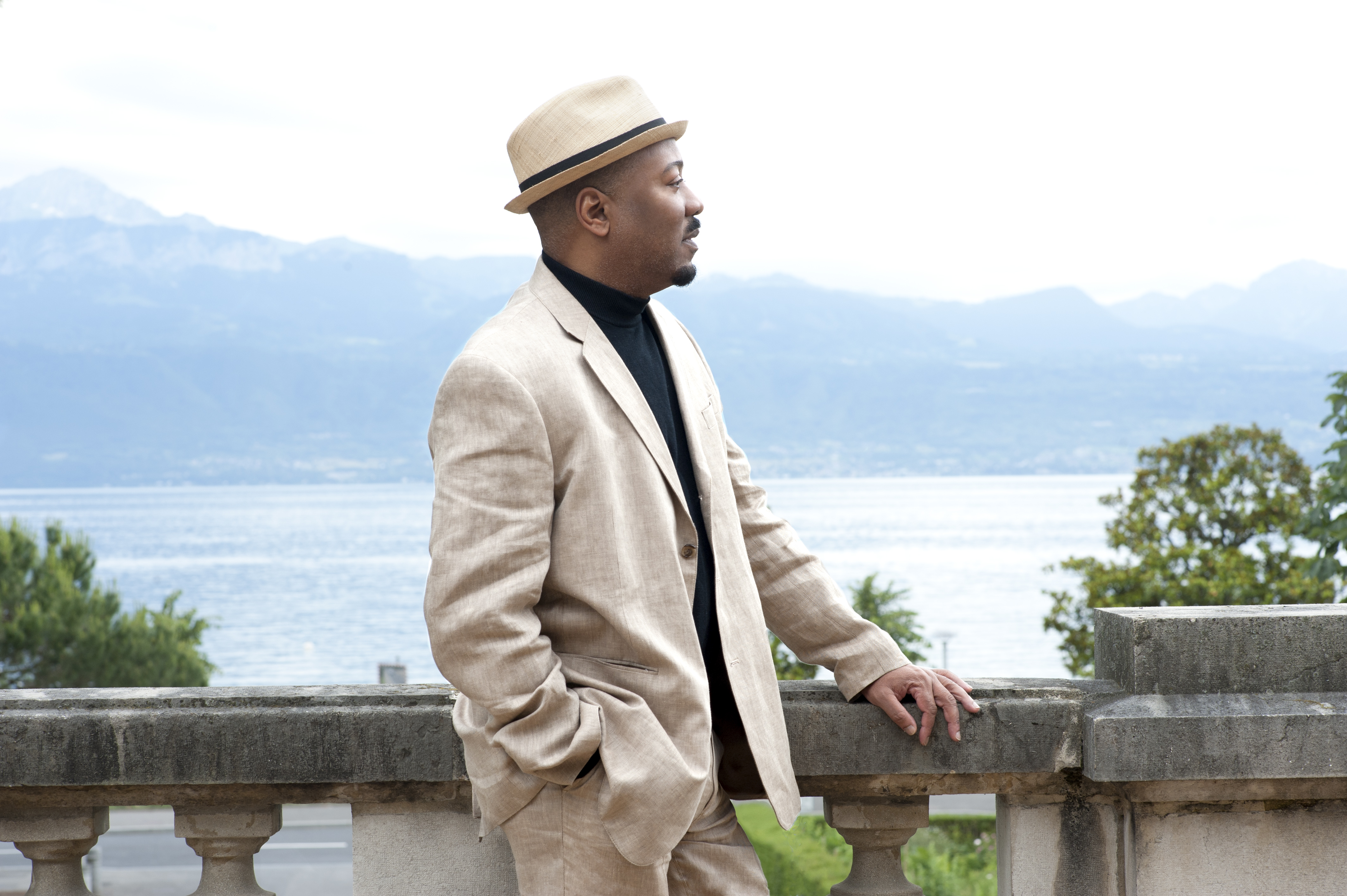
- Alonzo King
- Born: 1952; Albany, Georgia, U.S.
- Occupation(s): Dancer, Choreographer
- Years active: 1981–present
- Awards: Dance Magazine Award, 2020; Doris Duke Performing Artist Award, 2015; San Francisco Museum & Historical Society San Francisco Treasure Award, 2012; Jacob's Pillow Dance Creativity Award, 2008; Bessie Award for Choreographer/Creator, 2005; Kennedy Center Master of Choreography, 2005
- Website: linesballet.org

Alonzo King, born in Georgia to civil-rights activists Slater King and Valencia King Nelson, is an American dancer and choreographer based in San Francisco. King grew up in Georgia and California, where he attended Santa Barbara High School. As an adult, he decided to pursue teaching and choreography. In 1982, having established himself as a well-respected teacher, he founded Alonzo King LINES Ballet. Believing that everyone has the potential to grow through dance, seven years later he opened what was then known as the San Francisco Dance Center, offering classes for both professionals and the community.

Alonzo holds Honorary Doctorate Degrees from The Juilliard School, California Institute of the Arts, and Dominican University of California.

== Alonzo King LINES Ballet ==
In 1982, upon relocating back to California, King founded Alonzo King LINES Ballet, which premiered at the San Francisco State's McKenna Theater. Sharing his choreography around the world, LINES Ballet performs bi-annual home seasons at the Yerba Buena Center for the Arts in San Francisco, and also maintains an international touring schedule including a recent set of performances in Hong Kong of The Propelled Heart in September 2017.

== Awards and recognition ==
King is the recipient of numerous awards including an NEA choreographic fellowship, San Francisco Mayor's Award, a Jacob's Pillow Creativity Award, and Kennedy Center Master of Choreography which was awarded in 2005. In 2020, he was one of five honorees of the Dance Magazine Awards. In addition to his work for LINES Ballet, King's choreography is also in the repertoire of other dance companies including The Royal Swedish Ballet, Ballet Frankfurt, Ballet Béjart, Les Ballets de Monte-Carlo, Joffrey Ballet, Alvin Ailey American Dance Theater, Hong Kong Ballet, North Carolina Dance Theatre, and Hubbard Street Dance Chicago.

== Selected works ==
- 2013: Meyer
- 2012: AZIMUTH, Constellation
- 2011: Resin, Figures of Thought
- 2010: Writing Ground, Wheel in the Middle of the Field
- 2009: Scheherazade, Refraction, Dust and Light
- 2008: The Radius of Convergence, The Steady Articulation of Perseverance
- 2007: Rasa, Irregular Pearl, Long River, High Sky
- 2006: Sky Clad, Migration
- 2005: The Moroccan Project, Handel, Salt, Odd Fellow, Satoh
- 2004: Before the Blues, Rite of Spring, Baker Fix, Coleman Hawkins, The Patience of Aridity, Waiting for Petrichor
- 2003: Heart Song, Syzmanski's Vibraphone Quartet
- 2002: Road, Splash, Koto
- 2001: The People of the Forest, The Heart's Natural Inclination
- 2000: Following the Subtle Current Upstream, Soothing the Enemy, Riley, Tango, In to Get Out
- 1999: Shostakovich String Quartet
- 1998: Hovering Slightly Above Ground, Who Dressed You Like a Foreigner?, Tarab, Long Straight Line, Map, Land Forms
- 1997: String Trio, Suite Etta, Three Stops On the Way Home, Handel Trio
- 1996: Klang, Sacred Text, Handel Pas de Deux, Ground
- 1995: Signs and Wonders, Rock, String Quartet
- 1994: Poulenc Pas de Deux, Ocean, Along the Path
- 1993: Bach Cello Suite, Compelling Geological Evidence, Pavane
- 1992: Gurdjieff Piano Music
- 1991: Song of the Aka, Cante
- 1990: Without Wax, Toccata in D Minor
- 1989: Lila, Fallen Angel
- 1988: Awake in the Dream, Ligeti Variations, Reoccurrence
- 1987: Rain Dreaming, Granados Pas de Deux
- 1986: Prayer, Stealing Light
- 1983: Ictus
