= SCP =

SCP may refer to:

== Organizations ==
=== Political parties ===
- Soviet Communist Party, the leading political party in the former Soviet Union
- Syrian Communist Party
- Sudanese Communist Party
- Sudanese Congress Party
- Scottish Christian Party

=== Companies ===
- Seattle Computer Products, an American computer company
- Sheridan Coakley Products (SCP), British furniture manufacturer
- Smyrne Cassaba & Prolongements, a defunct Ottoman railway company
- Sociedad Comercial del Plata, an Argentine real estate and tourist attraction developer

=== Schools ===
- School for Command Preparation, part of the United States Army Command and General Staff College at Fort Leavenworth
- Stanton College Preparatory School, a high school in Jacksonville, Florida, United States

=== Other organizations ===
- Salisbury City Police, a defunct city police force in Wiltshire, England operational between 1838–1943
- Sporting Clube de Portugal, a sports club in Lisbon, Portugal, often known outside Portugal as "Sporting Lisbon."
- Sociaal en Cultureel Planbureau, Dutch name for The Netherlands Institute for Social Research
- Society of Catholic Priests, a community of priests in the Anglican Communion
- Society of Christian Philosophers
- Society of Chiropodists and Podiatrists
- Spiritual Counterfeits Project, a Christian evangelical parachurch organization

== Mathematics and technology ==
- Secure copy protocol, an outdated network protocol and its UNIX-family OS command scp
- Service control point, a component of an intelligent network architecture for managing telephony networks
- Softcore processor or soft microprocessor, a processor-implemented through a hardware definition language on a programmable logic device
- Service class provider, in the Digital Imaging and Communications in Medicine standard
- Short circuit protection in power supplies
- Single User Control Program, an East-German CP/M derivative by Robotron
- Sun Certified Professional, a professional certification program by Sun Microsystems
- Set cover problem, a classical problem in computer science and complexity theory
- Save Cursor Position (ANSI), an ANSI X3.64 escape sequence
- Smart, connected products, jargon for products with sensors and software and the ability to connect to a network allowing the product to transmit and receive data
- SAP Cloud Platform, platform as a service by SAP SE
- Simultaneous close parallel PRM approach, a type of instrument approach operation in aviation

== Arts and entertainment ==
- Super Caesars Palace, a 1993 video game for the Super Nintendo Entertainment System
- SCP Foundation, a collaborative writing website and fictional universe centered around a top-secret organization for the containment of paranormal entities and phenomena
  - SCP-173, an anomalous entity with the ability to move only when not observed by another living being
  - SCP: Secret Laboratory, a 2017 multiplayer first-person shooter video game inspired by SCP Foundation
  - SCP – Containment Breach, a 2012 survival horror PC game, based on the SCP Foundation universe
  - V/H/S: SCP, the tenth installment of V/H/S franchise, based on the SCP Foundation universe
- FreeSpace 2 Source Code Project, a collaborative fan project to create an upgraded engine of the computer game FreeSpace 2

== Natural sciences ==
- Single-cell protein
- Spheroidal carbonaceous particles
- Sterol carrier protein
- Stromal cell protein
- Superior cerebellar peduncle
- South celestial pole, an imaginary point in the southern celestial hemisphere, directly above the geographic South Pole
- Supercell composite parameter, a composite index used to measure environmental favorability for supercells; see glossary of tornado terms § S
- Supernova Cosmology Project, one of the physics research teams discovered that the expansion of the universe is accelerating
- Schlüter Crater Pit, a lunar pit cave
- SCP 06F6, an astronomical object discovered in the constellation Boötes

== Other uses ==
- Simple commodity production, independent producers trading their own products
- South Caucasus Pipeline
- Strathclyde Country Park
- Structure–conduct–performance paradigm, a model of industrial organization
- Supreme Court of Pakistan
- Sustainable consumption, and production
