= SCPB =

SCPB may refer to:

- C5a peptidase, an enzyme
- the ICAO code for Puelo Bajo Airport

== See also ==
- SCP (disambiguation)
- SCPA (disambiguation)
