= Izumi Kato =

- Izumi Kato (swimmer) (1990), Japanese swimmer
- Izumi Katō (artist) (1969), Japanese artist, painter, and sculptor
