= Memory erasure =

Selective artificial removal of memories or associations from the mind

Memory erasure is the selective artificial removal of memories or associations from the mind. Memory erasure has been shown to be possible in some experimental conditions; some of the techniques currently being investigated are, drug-induced amnesia, selective memory suppression, destruction of neurons, interruption of memory, memory reconsolidation, and the disruption of specific molecular mechanisms.

There are many reasons that research is being done on the selective removal of memories. Potential patients for this research include patients with psychiatric disorders such as post traumatic stress disorder, or substance use disorder, among others.

Memory erasure is also featured in numerous works of fiction, with fictional methods and properties that do not necessarily correspond with scientific reality.

== Recent history ==
Research focused on gaining a better understanding of what memories are has been going on for many years, in this way so has research in memory erasure. The basis for the recent history for memory erasure has been focused on determining how the brain actively keeps memories stored and retrieves them. There have been several instances where researchers found drugs that when applied to certain areas of the brain, usually the amygdala, have relative success in being able to erase some memories. As early as 2009 researchers were able to trace and destroy neurons involved in supporting the specific type of memory that they were trying to erase. These neurons were targeted by using replication-defective herpes simplex virus (HSV) to increase cyclic adenosine monophosphate response element-binding protein (CREB) in them. As a result, the neurons were activated in fear memory or testing far more often in both wild-type and CREB-deficient mice. For the study, transgenic mice were used that allowed use of diphtheria toxin to preferentially target cells that were overexpressing CREB, since these were the cells more likely involved with fear memories. This caused the erasure of the target memory but allowed the mice to still form new fear memories which confirmed the cells were involved only in storing fear memories and not forming them.

Aside from the biotechnology approach to studying memory, research in psychiatry on how memories work has also been going on for several years. There have been some studies that show that some behavioral therapy can erase bad memories. There has been some evidence that psychodynamic therapy and other energy techniques can help with forgetting memories among other psychiatric issues there is no proven therapeutic approach for trying to erase bad memories.

== Potential patients ==
There are several different types of possible patients that have the potential to draw great benefit from the selective memory erasure; these include people with drug addiction, or posttraumatic stress disorder (PTSD). PTSD patients may include war veterans, people who witnessed horrific events, victims of violent crimes and many other possibly traumatic events. These potential patients have unwanted memories that can be absolutely devastating to their daily lives and cause them to not be able to function properly.

Research continues, and in 2020, researchers were looking at potential new approaches to PTSD treatment.

== Different types of memories ==
There are three main types of memories: sensory memory, short-term memory, and long-term memory. Sensory memory, in short, is the ability to hold sensory information for a short period of time, for example, looking at an object and being able to remember what it looked like moments after. Short-term memory is memory that allows a person to recall a short period of time; this can be a few seconds to a minute. Short-term memory allows people to remember what happened during that short time span without actually practicing the memory. Long-term memory has a much larger capacity than the prior two and actually stores information from both these types of memories to create a long lasting and large memory. Long-term memory is the largest target for research involving selective memory erasure.

Within long-term memory there are several types of retention. Implicit memory (or 'muscle memory') is generally described as the ability to remember how to use objects or specific movements of the body (e.g. using a hammer). Explicit memory, (or 'declarative memory') is that which can be consciously drawn upon by a person to remember.

Explicit memory can be split into further subcategories; episodic memory, which is the memory of specific events and the information surrounding it, and semantic memory, which is the ability to remember factual information (e.g. what numbers mean).

A type of memory of main concern for memory erasure are emotional memories. These memories often involve several different aspects of information in them that can come from a variety of the different categories of memories mentioned above. These emotional memories are powerful memories that can elicit strong physiological effects on a person. An example of an emotional memory can be found in patients with PTSD, for these patients a traumatic event has left a lasting emotional memory that can have powerful effects on a person even without them consciously retrieving the memory.

== Current research ==
=== Drug-induced amnesia ===
Drug-induced amnesia is the idea of selectively losing or inhibiting the creation of memories using drugs. Amnesia can be used as a treatment for patients who have experienced psychological trauma or for medical procedures where full anesthesia is not an option. Drug-induced amnesia is also a side-effect of other drugs like alcohol and rohypnol.

There are other drugs that also can cause their users to be put in an amnesic state, where they experience some type of amnesia because of their use. Examples of these drugs include Triazolam, Midazolam and Diazepam.

=== Disruption of molecular mechanisms ===
There is a growing amount of information that has shown that memory depends largely on the brain's synaptic plasticity, with a large part of this being dependent on its ability to maintain long-term potentiation (LTP). Studies on LTP have also started to indicate that there are several molecular mechanisms that may be at the basis of memory storage. A more recent approach to erasing memories and the associations the brain makes with objects is disrupting specific molecular mechanisms in the brain that are actively keeping memories active.

Recovering methamphetamine (meth) addicts have reported that the sight of certain objects such as a lighter, gum or drug paraphernalia can cause massive cravings that can sometimes lead to a break in their mental strength and cause them to relapse. This indicates that long-term memories can be called upon by various different associations that were made with the memory without the conscious effort of the person. With an increasing belief that memories are largely supported by functional and structural plasticity deriving from F-actin polymerization in postsynaptic dendritic spines at excitatory synapses. Recent research has been done to target this F-actin polymerization by using direct actin depolymerization or a myosin II inhibitor to disrupt the polymerized F-actin associated with METH memory associations. The study indicated types of associations can be disrupted days to weeks after consolidation. Although the depolymerization techniques had no effect on food reward based associations or shock based associations the results demonstrate the idea that meth associated memories' actin cytoskeleton is constantly changing making it uniquely sensitive to depolymerization during the maintenance phase. This is some of the first evidence showing that memories made with different associations are actively maintained using different molecular substrates. These results also show that the actin cytoskeleton may be a promising target for selective disruption of unwanted long-term memories.

=== Selective memory suppression ===
Selective memory suppression is the idea that someone can consciously block an unwanted memory. Several different therapeutic techniques or training have been attempted to test this idea with varied success. Many of these techniques focus on blocking the retrieval of a memory using suppression techniques to slowly teach the brain to suppress the memory. Although some of these techniques have been useful for some people it has not been shown to be a clear cut solution to forgetting memories. Because these memories are not truly erased but merely suppressed the question of how permanent the solution is and what actually happens to the memories can be troubling for some.

Selective memory suppression is also something that can occur without a person being consciously aware of suppressing the creation and retrieval of unwanted memories. When this occurs without the person knowing, it is usually referred to as memory inhibition; the memory itself is called a repressed memory.

==== Interruption of memory reconsolidation ====
One of the ways scientists have attempted to erase these memories through suppression is by interrupting the reconsolidation of a memory. Reconsolidation of a memory is when a person recalls a memory, usually a fearful one; it becomes susceptible to alteration, and then gets stored again. This has led many researchers to believe that this time period is the best time for memories to be altered or erased. Studies have shown that through behavioral training results showed that they were able to erase memories by tampering with memories during the reconsolidation phase.

=== Destruction of neurons ===
With evidence showing that different memories excite different neurons or systems of neurons in the brain, the technique of destroying select neurons in the brain to erase specific memories is also being researched. Studies have started to investigate the possibility of using distinct toxins along with biotechnology that allows the researchers to see which areas of the brain are being used during the reward learning process of making a memory to destroy target neurons. In a paper published in 2009, authors showed that neurons in the lateral amygdala that had a higher level of cyclic adenosine monophosphate response element-binding protein (CREB) were activated primarily over other neurons by fear memory expression. This indicated to them that these neurons were directly involved in the making of the memory trace for that fear memory. They then proceeded to train mice using auditory fear training to produce a fear memory. They proceeded to check which of the neurons were overexpressing CREB and then, using an inducible diphtheria-toxin strategy, they destroyed those neurons, resulting in persistent and strong memory erasure of the fear memory.

Researchers have also found that the levels of the neurotransmitter, acetylcholine, can also affect which memories are most prominent in our minds.

Due to the lack of understanding of the brain, this technique of destroying neurons may have a much larger effect on the patient than just the removal of the intended memories. Due to this complex nature of the brain treatment, that would stun the neurons instead of destroying them could be another approach that could be taken.

=== Optogenetics ===
A way of selectively erasing memories may be possible through optogenetics, a type of gene therapy that targets specific neurons. In 2017, researchers at Stanford demonstrated a technique for observing hundreds of neurons firing in the brain of a live mouse, in real time, and have linked that activity to long-term information storage. By using a virus to trigger production of a light-sensitive protein in neurons linked to a fear, they could erase the memory by weakening the pathways using light.

== Measurement issues ==
There is an epistemological issue in determining whether the absence of evidence (i.e., memory trace) is evidence of absence. In experimental studies, the absence of behavior indicative of memory is sometimes interpreted as the absence of the memory trace; however, the memory impairment may be temporary due to deficits in recall. Alternatively, the memory trace may be latent and demonstrable via its indirect effects on new learning. The measurement issue is compounded by the fact that memory processes are dynamic and may not always manifest in single locations or in static and easily identifiable changes detectable by current technologies.

Michael Davis, a researcher at Emory University, argues that complete erasure can only be confidently concluded if all of the biological events that occurred when the memory was formed revert to their original status. The current state of technology and methodology may not be sensitive enough to detect all types of memory traces. Davis contends that because making these measurements in a complex organism is implausible, the concept of complete memory erasure (what he deems "strong form of forgetting") is not useful scientifically.

== Ethics ==
As with most new technologies, the idea of being able to erase memories comes with many ethical questions. One ethical question that arises is the idea that although there are some extremely painful memories that some people (for example, PTSD patients) would like to be rid of, not all unpleasant memories are bad. The ability to soften or erase memories could have drastic effects on how society functions. The ability to remember unpleasant effects from one's past has a huge impact on the future actions they may take. Remembering and learning from past mistakes is crucial in the emotional development of a person and helps to ensure they do not repeat previous errors. The ability to erase memory could also have a massive impact on the law. When it comes to determining the outcome of a trial, the ability to modify memory could have a massive impact on the judicial system. Another ethical question that arises is how the government would use this technology and what restrictions would need to be put in place. There is also concern that if servicemen are deployed into battle knowing that memories created during combat can effectively be erased, that could motivate them to refuse to uphold military morale and standards. Many are also skeptical about who should be able to have procedures done on them, so they are urging for a set of laws to determine this.

== In fiction ==
Memory erasure has also been a common topic of interest in science fiction and other fiction. Several notable comics, TV shows and movies feature memory erasure, including Telefon, Total Recall, Men in Black, Eternal Sunshine of the Spotless Mind, Black Mirror, Futurama, The Bourne Identity, the Mysterious Benedict Society, NBC's Heroes and Dollhouse. Novels that feature memory erasure include The Invincible by Stanisław Lem, some of the Harry Potter novels (including Harry Potter and the Chamber of Secrets) by J. K. Rowling, Artemis Fowl and the Eternity Code by Eoin Colfer, and The Giver by Lois Lowry. Several works by Philip K. Dick are about memory erasure, including "Paycheck", "We Can Remember It for You Wholesale" (which served as the inspiration for Total Recall). In the canon of the SCP Foundation, the organization uses substances called amnestics to erase memories for covering up supernatural phenomena. In There Is No Antimemetics Division, the organization discovers anomalies that can autonomously prevent people from remembering their existence.
