= Secret identity =

Personal identity less known to a public than another identity

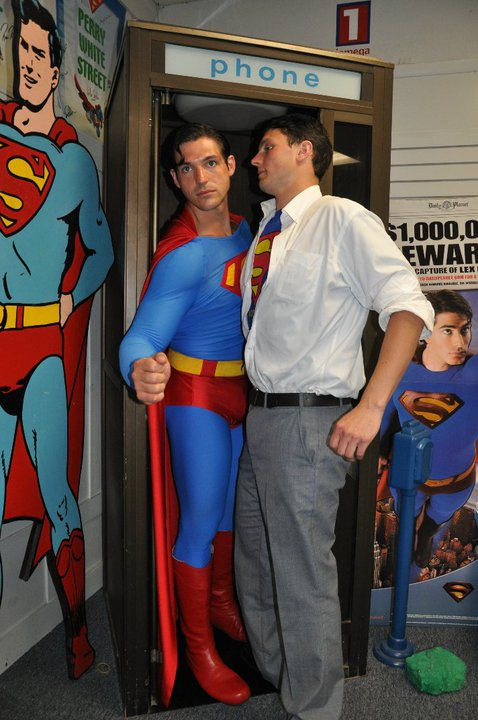
The character Superman is commonly depicted using phone booths to change from his secret identity of Clark Kent.

A secret identity is a person's cryptonym, incognito, cover and/or alter ego which is not known to the general populace, most often used in fiction. Brought into popular culture by the Scarlet Pimpernel in 1903, the concept was widespread in pulp heroes and is particularly prevalent in the American comic book genre, and is a trope of the masquerade.

In American comic books, a character typically has dual identities, one overt and one covert. The false or public identity being known to the general public as the "superhero persona" and the other being the secret identity. The private or secret identity is typically the superhero's legal name, true identity, and/or "civilian persona" when they are not actively assuming the superhero persona. It is kept hidden from their enemies and the general public to protect themselves from legal ramifications, pressure, or public scrutiny, as well as to protect their friends and loved ones from harm secondary to their actions as superheroes.

== See also ==
- Alter ego
- Incarnation
- Operational cover
