= Qntm =

British science fiction author and programmer

Sam Hughes
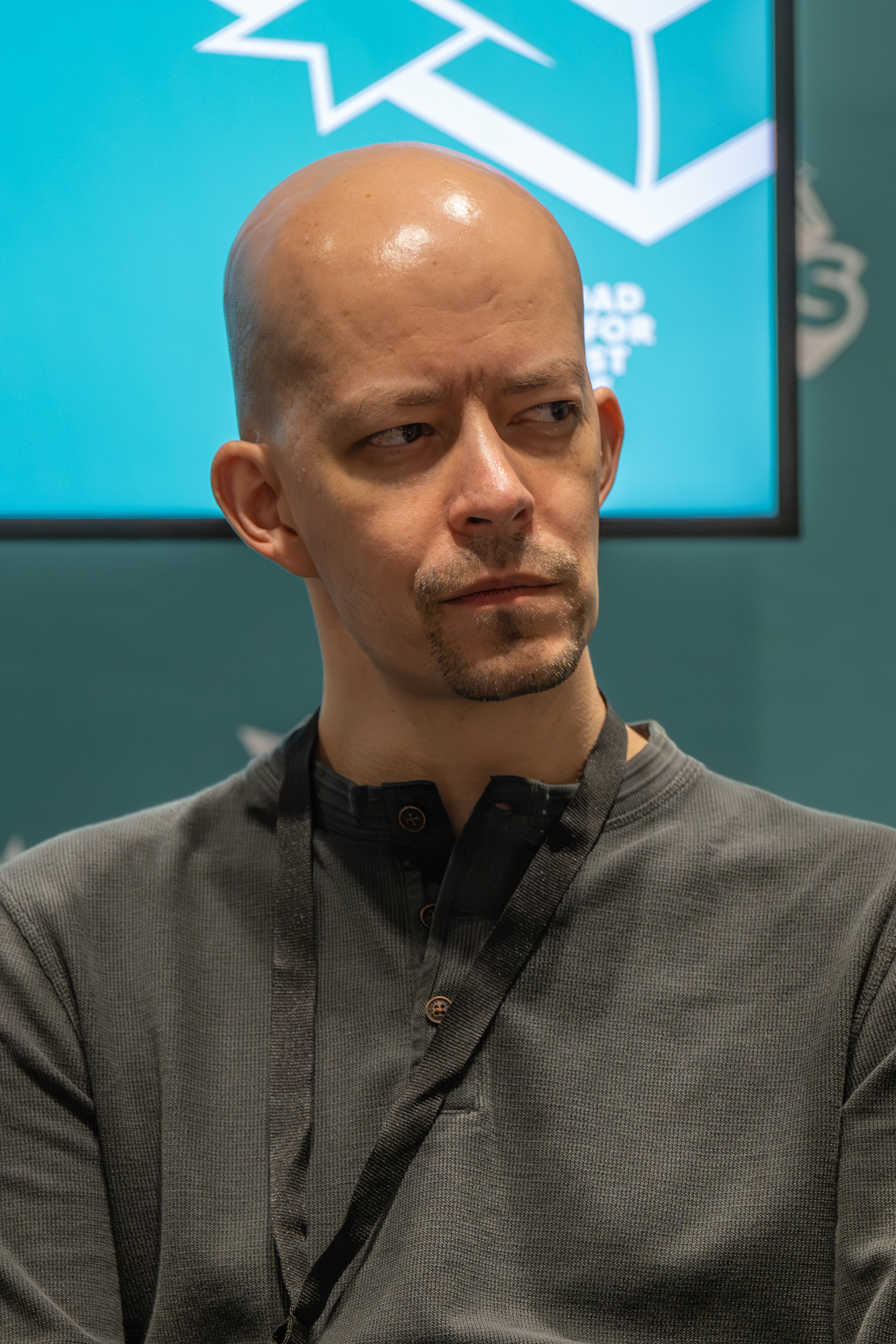
- Hughes in 2025
- Born: Sam Hughes; 1983 (age 42–43)
- Occupations: Author; programmer
- Writing career
- Pen name: qntm
- Genre: Science fiction
- Notable works: There Is No Antimemetics Division; Absurdle
- Website: qntm.org

Sam Hughes (born 1983), known online as and publishing under the pen name qntm (pronounced "quantum"), is a British programmer and science fiction author. Hughes' short stories include "Lena", about the first digital snapshot of a human brain. His serial novels include Ra and Fine Structure. He has also written for the SCP Foundation wiki; his novel There Is No Antimemetics Division began as an entry on the wiki. In 2024, Del Rey Books acquired UK and Commonwealth rights to the book, while Ballantine Books acquired the US rights.

In 2022, Hughes created Absurdle, a variant of Wordle wherein the word changes with every guess, while still remaining true to previous hints. The Guardian described it as "the Machiavellian version of Wordle", and Hughes described it as an "experiment to find the most difficult [...] variant of Wordle", comparing it to one of his previous projects, the Tetris variant Hatetris.

There Is No Antimemetics Division was nominated for the 2026 Arthur C. Clarke Award.

== Selected works ==
=== Serial novels ===
| Title | Began | Completed | Published as a single work |
|---|---|---|---|
| Ed | 2003 | 2005 | 2013 |
| Fine Structure | 2006 | 2010 | 2018 |
| Ra | 2011 | 2018 | 2018 |
| There Is No Antimemetics Division | 2008 | 2020 | 2020 (original); 2025 (rewrite) |

=== Anthologies ===
| Title | Year | Role | Notes |
|---|---|---|---|
| Valuable Humans in Transit and Other Stories | 2022 | Author | |
| The Big Book of Cyberpunk | 2023 | Contributor | Contributed the short story "Lena" |

=== Video games ===
| Title | Year | Platform |
|---|---|---|
| Hatetris | 2010 | Web game |
| Absurdle | 2022 | Web game |
