= There Is No Antimemetics Division =

Science fiction work by qntm

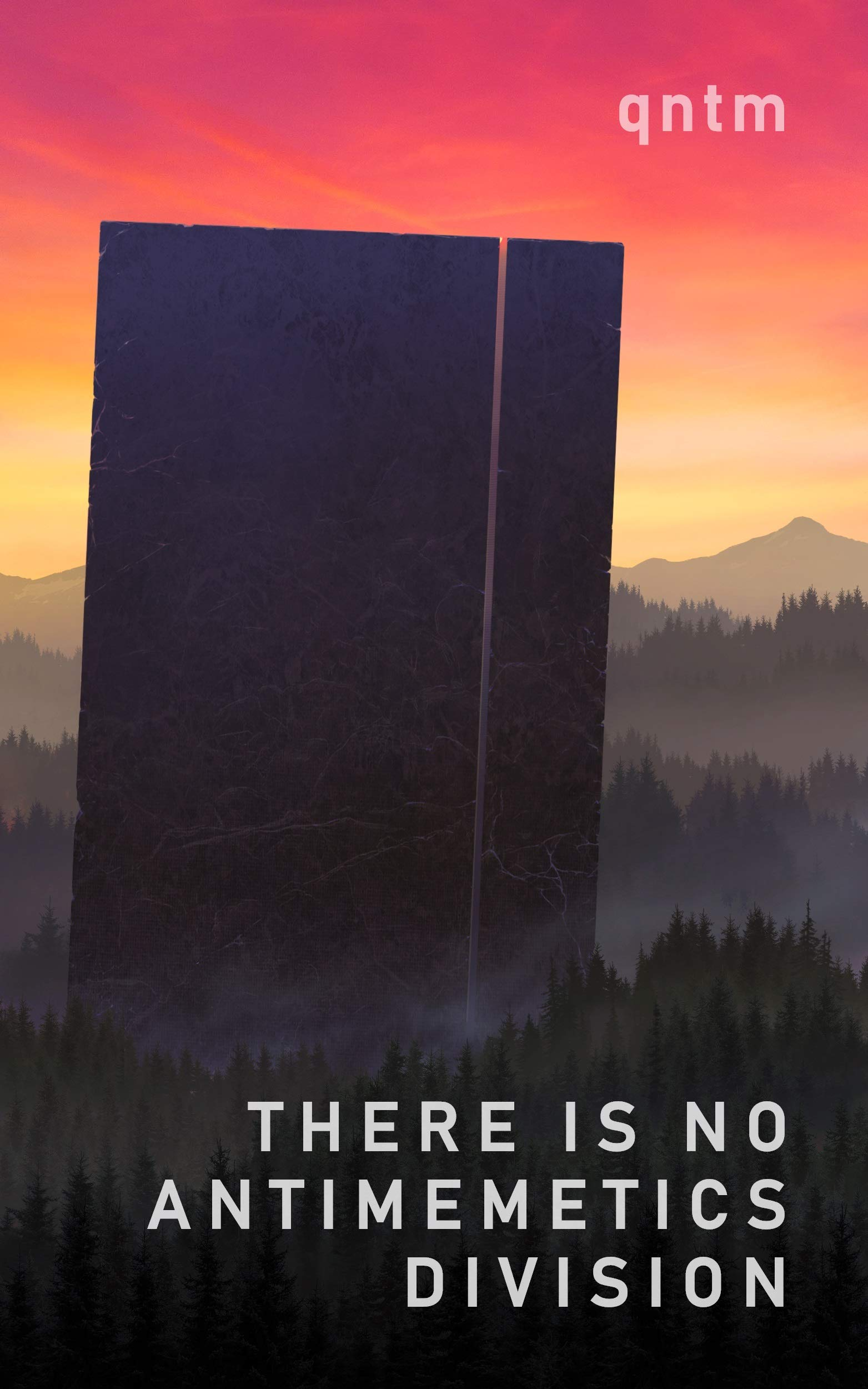
- Cover of the 2020 novel
- Author: qntm
- Audio read by: Rebecca Calder (revised novel)
- Language: English
- Series: SCP Foundation (web fiction, fix-up novel)
- Genres: Science fiction; Horror; Weird fiction
- Published in: SCP Wiki (web fiction)
- Publisher: Independent (fix-up novel), Del Rey (UK) & Ballantine (US) (revised novel)
- Publication date: 25 August 2008 ("SCP-055" web short fiction); 31 January 2015 – 1 January 2016 (There Is No Antimemetics Division web serial); 4 May 2017 – 13 June 2020 (Five Five Five Five Five web serial); 20 June 2020 (fix-up novel); 11 November 2025 (revised novel)
- ISBN: 978-0-593-98375-1 (revised novel)

There Is No Antimemetics Division is a literary work of science fiction–horror by British author qntm.

Beginning in 2015 as web serials inspired by his 2008 contribution to the collaborative fiction project SCP Foundation, Antimemetics was completed, then independently published as a fix-up novel compilation, in 2020. Penguin Random House imprints Del Rey and Ballantine published a significantly revised and expanded version of the novel in 2025, with many translations following.

The work revolves around the director of the "Antimemetics Division", a secret organisation at odds with paranormal memory- and perception-altering phenomena. As the Division's research into these phenomena progresses, the director begins to uncover erased memories and finds herself ensnared in a conflict that threatens all of reality.

== Plot ==
=== Marie Quinn ===
In the Unknown Organization, the Antimemetics Division is responsible for containing and studying "antimemetic" anomalies: entities that erase themselves from memory and perception. To function at all, Division staff rely on "mnestics", drugs that let them notice and retain awareness of antimemetic phenomena, even as prolonged use causes severe physical and cognitive harm. Division Director Marie Quinn repeatedly comes to understand, and then deliberately forgets, that the division is engaged in an ongoing, mostly unrecognized war against an apex antimemetic entity designated U-3125, an extradimensional "escapee" that cannot be safely known. U-3125 operates as a lethal information hazard: when someone successfully conceptualizes it, the entity detects them and proceeds to overwhelm and kill them, with the danger spreading through shared knowledge of U-3125.

As the situation deteriorates, Quinn takes extreme steps to limit who can be harmed by what she knows, including completely erasing her husband Adam and other key parts of her personal life from memory to prevent the conceptual contagion from reaching those close to her. She attempts to maintain continuity by working through recorded notes and controlled environments that reduce her exposure, while trying to assemble a plan she will not be able to reliably remember. Quinn concludes that the only viable route to victory is a device associated with researcher Ed Hix, an "irreality amplifier" intended to broadcast a counter-meme capable of opposing U-3125. As U-3125 breaches containment and begins assimilating personnel, Quinn reaches a large, sealed basement hangar under the Antimemetics Division's headquarters at Wyeleigh, where she expects the amplifier to be stored.

Instead of the expected device, Quinn finds a "memory bomb". Under attack from U-3125, of which she is now irreversibly aware, and her own condition failing from a lethal dose of mnestic medication, she detonates the bomb, erasing all living memory of the Antimemetics Division itself, preventing its further use as a U-3125 contagion vector and forcing a rupture in the war's continuity.

=== Adam Quinn ===
In the aftermath of the Wyeleigh incident, Marie Quinn is dead and forgotten. As her husband, Adam, begins noticing profound gaps and inconsistencies in his life and memory, U-3125 triumphs, causing mass atrocities across all of humanity. Adam, who has a weak natural immunity to antimemetic effects, slowly awakens from U-3125's influence. Guided by the antimemetic Unknown entity "Sunshine", which Marie previously domesticated, Adam journeys to the ruins of the Wyeleigh facility. There he discovers the remnants of Marie's plan. Sunshine sacrifices itself protecting Adam from a physical manifestation of U-3125; Adam obliterates the manifestation.

After a long journey north, Adam eventually locates Ed Hix, who is alive and has continued work in isolation for years, completing the irreality amplifier but lacking a viable method to supply the specific countermeme needed to activate it against U-3125. Adam then takes an extreme dose of mnestics to restore his memories, culminating in an encounter in "ideatic space" where Marie Quinn's recovered consciousness supplies the countermeme that is amplified to neutralize U-3125. With the threat eliminated and normalcy returning, UO leadership recognizes that major portions of recent history are inexplicably missing and moves to rebuild their capabilities.

=== Part 1 ===
In the SCP Foundation, the Antimemetics Division is responsible for containing and studying "antimemetic" anomalies: entities that erase themselves from memory and perception. To function at all, Division staff rely on "mnestics", drugs that let them notice and retain awareness of antimemetic phenomena, even as prolonged use causes severe physical and cognitive harm. Division Director Marion Wheeler repeatedly comes to understand, and then deliberately forgets, that the division is engaged in an ongoing, mostly unrecognized war against an apex antimemetic entity designated SCP-3125, an extradimensional "escapee" that cannot be safely known. SCP-3125 operates as a lethal indirect cognitohazard: when someone successfully conceptualizes it, the entity detects them and proceeds to overwhelm and kill them, with the danger spreading through shared knowledge of SCP-3125.

The Division started in the 1940s, by Lyn Patrick Marness, under the nickname "The Unthinkables". After WW2, the project was "acquired" by the Foundation in 1951 after the dissemination of an anomalous cult in Ojai. In 1976, SCP-3125 destroyed it, leaving only Marness alive.

As the situation deteriorates, Wheeler takes extreme steps to limit who can be harmed by what she knows, including completely erasing her husband Adam and other key parts of her personal life from memory to prevent the conceptual contagion from reaching those close to her. She attempts to maintain continuity by working through recorded notes and controlled environments that reduce her exposure, while trying to assemble a plan she will not be able to reliably remember. Wheeler concludes that the only viable route to victory is a device associated with researcher Bart Hughes, an "irreality amplifier" intended to broadcast a counter-meme capable of opposing SCP-3125. As SCP-3125 breaches containment and begins assimilating personnel, Wheeler reaches a large, sealed basement hangar under the Antimemetics Division's headquarters at Site 41, where she expects the amplifier to be stored.

Instead of the expected device, Quinn finds a "memory bomb". Under attack from SCP-3125, of which she is now irreversibly aware, and her own condition failing from a lethal dose of mnestic medication, she detonates the bomb, erasing all living memory of the Antimemetics Division itself, preventing its further use as an SCP-3125 contagion vector and forcing a rupture in the war's continuity.

=== Part 2 ===
In the aftermath of the Site 41 incident, Marion Wheeler is dead and forgotten. As her husband, Adam, begins noticing profound gaps and inconsistencies in his life and memory, SCP-3125 triumphs, causing mass atrocities across all of humanity. Adam, who has a weak natural immunity to antimemetic effects, slowly awakens from SCP-3125's influence. Guided by Daisy Ulrich, a member of Mobile Task Force ω-0, whose life Marion previously saved, Adam journeys to the ruins of Site-41. There he discovers the remnants of Marion's plan. Ulrich sacrifices itself protecting Adam from a physical manifestation of SCP-3125; Adam obliterates the manifestation.

After a long journey north, Adam eventually locates Hughes, who is alive and has continued work in isolation for years, completing the irreality amplifier but lacking a viable method to supply the specific counter-meme needed to activate it against SCP-3125. Adam then takes an extreme dose of mnestics to restore his memories, culminating in an encounter in "ideatic space" where Marion Wheeler's recovered consciousness supplies the counter-meme that is amplified to neutralise SCP-3125. With the threat eliminated and normalcy returning, Foundation leadership recognises that major portions of recent history are inexplicably missing and moves to rebuild their capabilities.

== Development ==
There Is No Antimemetics Division began with a short fiction work by qntm, "SCP-055", published on the SCP Wiki in 2008. A web serial named There Is No Antimemetics Division was originally released on the SCP Wiki by qntm from January 31, 2015, through January 1, 2016. The sequel story Five Five Five Five Five was released from May 4, 2017, through June 13, 2020. On June 20, 2020, a fixup sharing the name of the first serial was released by qntm.

The UK publishing rights for a new version of the novel were acquired by Del Rey Books in 2024, while the North American rights were acquired by Ballantine Books. The novel was released on November 11, 2025. It retains some of the original formatting from the version on the SCP Wiki, such as redacted information and missing letters, but omits character names and concepts under a CC BY-SA 3.0 license, replacing references to "the Foundation" with "the Organization" and "SCPs" with "Unknowns".

== Reception ==
The novel received positive reactions from critics. The Washington Post praised the novel, describing it as containing "a story worthy of Lovecraft" and noting the use of inserted documents from the in-universe Antimemetics Division as a way of increasing the book's immersion. Lisa Tuttle, writing in The Guardian, recommended the novel as an "unforgettable" read. Dirt also published a positive review, praising the novel's plot and connection to modern-day anxieties around technology. Kirkus Reviews positively compared the book to The Twilight Zone and The Matrix, while Publishers Weekly complimented the book's concepts but noted that the "zany narrative" could potentially confuse readers.

There Is No Antimemetics Division was nominated for the 2026 Arthur C. Clarke Award.

== Adaptations ==
A four-episode web series adaptation of the SCP version, SCP: There Is No Antimemetics Division, directed by Andrea Joshua Asnicar, was released from 27 March to 16 April 2024. "We Need To Talk About Fifty-Five", a chapter of the first Antimemetics web serial, was adapted into a short film directed by Adria Lang and starring Jasika Nicole. The film screened at the 2025 Chattanooga Film Festival and was released by DUST on 2 February 2026. A play adaptation for it has not been confirmed.
