= Absurdle =

2022 web-based video game

- Developer: qntm
- Platform: Web
- Release: 2022
- Genres: Puzzle, word game
- Mode: Single-player

Absurdle is a 2022 web-based puzzle word game created by Sam Hughes, commonly known as qntm. It is a Wordle clone in which the player attempts to guess a five-letter word while the game changes the solution. Inspired by his other project Hatetris, he created Absurdle to experiment the passive-aggressiveness of the former game.

== Gameplay ==
In Absurdle, the solution is changed each turn.

In Absurdle, the player attempts to guess a five-letter word, similarly to Wordle. However, while Wordle picks a single secret word at the beginning of the game, Absurdle gives the impression of picking a single secret word, but actually considers the entire list of all possible secret words which conform to the player's existing guesses. On each guess, Absurdle picks the word coloring which prunes the possible word list the least, giving the player the least possible amount of information and attempting to intentionally prolong the game. Unlike Wordle, Absurdle has infinite guesses.

== Development ==
According to qntm, his inspiration to develop Absurdle came from Hatetris, one of his projects in which the game spawns the worst possible tetromino in a Tetris game. He wanted to take the difficulty of Hatetris and apply it to Wordle.

== Reception ==
Ranking Absurdle as his favorite Wordle clone, Graham Smith of Rock Paper Shotgun felt the game's difficulty encouraged efficiency. Reviewers appreciated the ability to guess freely.

== See also ==
- Adversary model
- Online algorithm
