= SCP-173 =

Fictional anomalous concrete statue

- SCP Foundation character
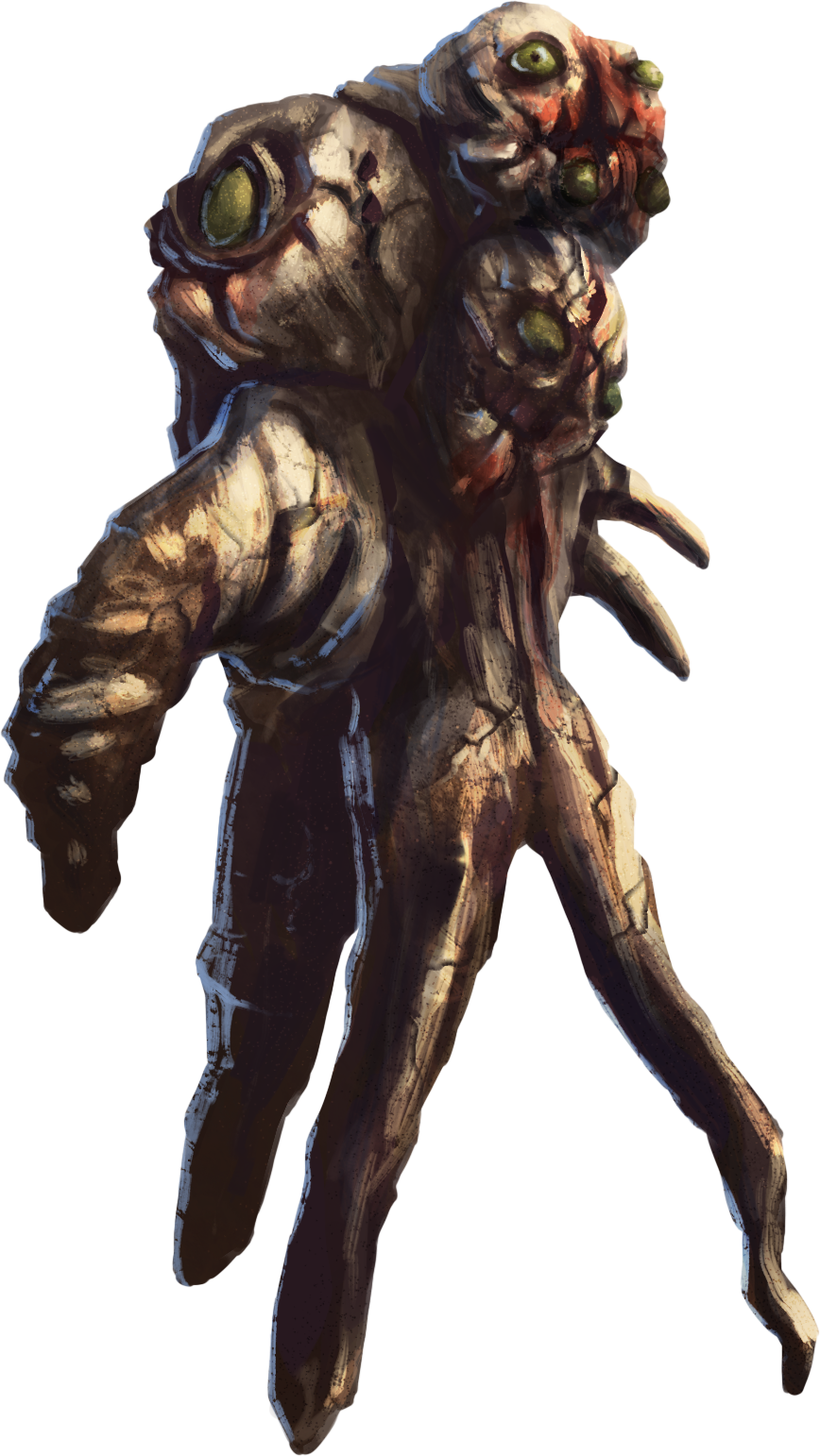
- SCP-173 as depicted in the game SCP: Secret Laboratory
- First appearance: /x/
- Created by: Wesley "Moto42" Williams

In-universe information
- Aliases: The Sculpture; The Statue; Peanut
- Class: Euclid

SCP-173, also known as the Sculpture, is a fictional character originating from 4chan and spawning the SCP Foundation collaborative writing project. Within the fictional universe of the SCP Foundation, it is a large statue, made primarily of concrete and rebar, that has the ability to move so long as it is not being directly observed by a living being.

The story of SCP-173 was written on the /x/ board of 4chan in June 2007 by an anonymous user. It was the first article about SCP, and much of the SCP Foundation mythos is based upon it. The image originally associated with SCP-173 was a picture of an existing statue called Untitled 2004, made of painted wood by Japanese artist Izumi Katō. This image was deleted from the article in 2022 to abide by the wiki's Creative Commons license.

Since its creation, SCP-173 has consistently been one of the most famous and popular characters in the mythos, appearing in many derivative pieces of media.

== Fictional description ==
SCP-173 is described as a roughly human-sized sculpture made from concrete and rebar that has been coated in Krylon branded spray paint. It is listed under the 'Euclid' object class on the wiki, (Note: Some other notable object classes include: 'Safe', 'Keter', and 'Thaumiel'.) which means it is considered unpredictable and may potentially escape containment if containment procedures are not followed. When SCP-173 is unobserved and left alone in its containment chamber, it moves around aimlessly, creating a scraping sound due to its concrete body. The entity also secretes a reddish-brown substance, which is a combination of blood and feces. From where and how the entity produces or excretes the material is unknown. If it is not directly observed, it will attack and kill humans by breaking their necks.

SCP-173's containment chamber is located in a top-secret facility known as Site-19. SCP-173's containment procedures require that no less than three people enter its chamber at any time; two of these people must keep eye contact with the anomaly at all times, and are to alert one another when blinking, in order to prevent it accidentally finding a brief window of time to attack. Its chamber must be cleaned on a bi-weekly basis, due to the amount of feces and blood that accumulates.

The physical appearance of SCP-173 can vary depending on the media it is being depicted in. Before the removal of its original image from the wiki; most depictions of SCP-173 were consistent, depicting it as a tall, bulbous, humanoid figure. However, after 2022, these depictions have become much more varied in form, ranging from humanoid shapes to more abstract and bizarre forms.

SCP-173 in a book published by Seitosha

SCP-173 in a manga published by Ichijinsha

SCP-173 in a book published by Kadokawa Corporation

SCP-173 in a book published by Shinyusha

== History ==
The SCP-173 article originally featured a photograph of the sculpture Untitled 2004 by Izumi Katō. The photograph was removed from the wiki in 2022 to comply with the artist's copyright and the wiki's Creative Commons licensing guidelines.

The original SCP-173 article was written on June 22, 2007, as an anonymous post on 4chan's /x/ board (the writer was later identified as Wesley "Moto42" Williams). This post was the first SCP article written, and became the basis of the SCP Foundation mythos, including its writing format and clinical tone.

The original image used in the 4chan post was a photograph taken by Keisuke Yamamoto of the statue Untitled 2004 by Izumi Katō. Moto42 did not obtain permission from either individual to use this specific image for the post. In 2014, after the English and Japanese branches of the SCP Wikidot had managed to contact Katō, he reluctantly allowed the image to be used in SCP related works, so long as it was only for non-commercial purposes, and noted that he would take legal action against anyone who violated this request. A warning was added to the bottom of the article in accordance with this.

Due to a combination of merchandise sellers making money off of Untitled 2004's likeness against Katō's wishes, as well as the fact that the image itself violated the Creative Commons license that the SCP wiki uses, both the image and the warning were removed in 2022. (Note: Izumi Katō himself had no involvement in the removal of the image.) At the request of Moto42, no replacement image was provided so that readers could imagine their own interpretations of the statue. The deletion of SCP-173's original image led to a large collaboration of artists creating their own interpretations of SCP-173. These designs are all hosted on the SCP Foundation Wikidot on a designated page, which is jokingly referred to as the "Peanut Gallery".

== Reception ==
SCP-173 has been mostly positively received by audiences. It is considered one of the most well known and popular SCPs, and is the most highly upvoted article on the SCP Wikidot. The character has often been used as a source of both horror and humor by the community. James Potvin, writing for Screen Rant, noted that its eroded concrete and rebar form, as well as its constant secretion of blood and feces makes it a rather grotesque take on the concept of an animate statue. The bulbous form and curvature of the original Untitled 2004 image has also caused the community to give it the nickname "Peanut".

The document format and clinical tone of the original 4chan post has also been seen as a positive aspect setting it apart from Creepypasta and other similar forms of internet storytelling, with it forgoing the usual single punchline format for an emphasis on mystery and the fear of the unknown. Gita Jackson, writing for Kotaku, stated that the post's horror primarily came from it using the possibility of what might happen if it escapes as opposed to describing story events outright.

The unauthorized usage of Untitled 2004 in the original article has seen scrutiny, however. Tosha R. Taylor, in their essay "Horror Memes and Digital Culture", notes that due to SCP-173's fame eclipsing that of Untitled 2004, it projects the idea of the anomaly over the original sculpture itself, and that familiarity with SCP-173 could make it difficult to associate Untitled 2004 with anything other than a representation of a dangerous anomaly.

Its ability to only move when unobserved sees comparison with similar entities, such as the Weeping Angels from Doctor Who or the Creaking from Minecraft. The Weeping Angels specifically are sometimes speculated to be a possible inspiration due to the time of SCP-173's creation. Justin Jones, in his 2022 thesis, mentioned this theory, however, believing that the observation-based movement derived convergently based on an innate connection between the human senses and fear.

SCP-173's appearance in SCP – Containment Breach has also seen acclaim. Gab Hernandez, writing for Screen Rant, lists it among their list of top 10 horror game antagonists of the 2010s. It also ranks first on Elias Rodriguez's and Nicholas Pence's Dualshockers list of the top 18 enemies in horror games. They specifically note how it pairs well with other threats in the game due to its nature of only moving when not observed leading it to constantly require the player's utmost attention.

== Adaptations ==
A teaser trailer for SCP: Secret Laboratory featuring SCP-173

SCP-173 has been featured in various forms of media since its creation.

- SCP-173 appears as the primary antagonist in the video game SCP - Containment Breach. It first appears in the game's introduction, where the player "Subject D-9341" is sent in alongside two other D-Class personnel in order to perform an unspecified test. Due to outside influences, SCP-173 is able to escape. After escaping its containment chamber, SCP-173 will follow the player throughout the rest of the game, in an attempt to kill them. One of the game's primary game mechanics is a blink meter that decreases until it is completely empty; The player will blink once this happens, and like in the article, SCP-173 will move towards them and eventually kill them if it gets close enough.
- It is a playable character in SCP: Secret Laboratory, an asymmetrical team based first person shooter. In this game, the SCP-173 player must team up with other SCPs such as SCP-049 and 106 in order to kill all human players in the facility.
- A clone of SCP-173, designated 'SCP-173-B', is featured in the video game SCP: 5K. It behaves identical to the original statue, though it has a different design.
- SCP-173 is featured as one of the antagonists in the 2026 short film SCP: Containment Breach.
