= SCP Foundation =

Online collaborative writing project

- Logo of the SCP Foundation

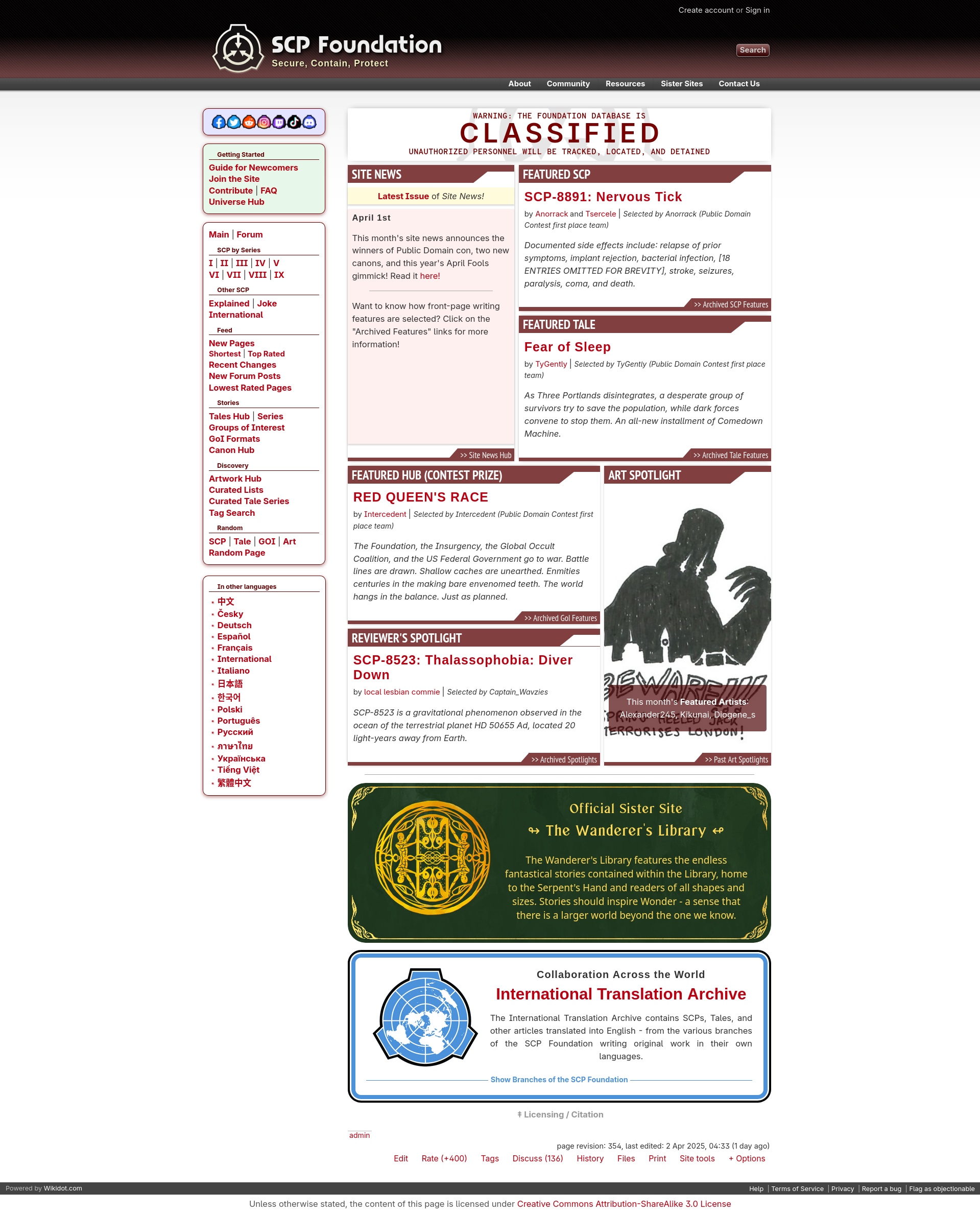
- Screenshot Screenshot of the SCP Foundation's homepage, 2025
- Website type: Collaborative fiction project
- Available in: English and 15 other languages (Note: Official language branches of the SCP Foundation exist in German, Korean, Japanese, Russian, Thai, Spanish, Polish, Italian, French, Ukrainian, Portuguese, Czech, Chinese (both simplified and traditional), and Vietnamese.)
- Editor: SCP Foundation community
- Website: scpwiki.com
- Registration: Optional (Note: Registration is only required to submit works and projects, or to leave comments and vote upon existing works. The site is free to view to people without an account.)
- Launched: January 19, 2008; 18 years ago (original); July 19, 2008; 18 years ago (current site)
- Current status: Active
- Content license: CC BY-SA 3.0

The SCP Foundation is a fictional secret organization and the premise of the SCP Wiki, a wiki-based collaborative fiction project launched in 2008. Within the project's shared world, the SCP (Note: The term SCP exists as an initialism for "Special Containment Procedures"; it does not have a formal meaning in-universe. The motto "Secure, Contain, Protect" was created as a backronym.) Foundation is responsible for capturing, containing, and studying paranormal, supernatural, and other mysterious phenomena (known as "anomalies" or "SCPs"), while also keeping their existence hidden from society.

The collaborative writing project includes elements of horror, science fiction, and urban fantasy. The majority of works on the SCP Wiki are "SCP files": mock confidential scientific reports that document various SCPs and associated containment procedures; the website also contains "Foundation Tales", short stories featuring various characters and settings in the SCP universe.

The site's literary works have been praised for their ability to convey horror through a quasi-scientific and academic writing style, as well as for their high standards of quality. The SCP universe has inspired adaptations in various media, including literature, short films, and video games.

== Overview ==
The fictional setting of the SCP universe revolves around the findings and activities of the SCP Foundation, an international secret society, scientific research institution, and paramilitary force. The organization is generally portrayed as operating independently of any national government, answering only to its own mysterious, shadow government-like leadership body known as the O5 Council or Overseers. The Foundation captures and contains various unexplained paranormal phenomena (referred to as "anomalies", "SCP objects", "SCPs", or informally "skips") which display supernatural abilities or other extremely unusual properties that defy conventional scientific laws. These phenomena can include living beings, objects, places, abstract concepts, or incomprehensible entities. Typically, the Foundation is depicted as striving to conceal the existence of the paranormal—as well as of itself—due to its belief in human civilization's need to continue functioning under a masquerade of "normalcy".

Commonalities between SCP works include teams of Foundation agents deploying to newly discovered anomalies, either safeguarding them in situ or covertly transporting them to Foundation facilities. The Foundation is frequently depicted interrogating eyewitnesses and then dosing them with amnestic drugs to erase their memories of anomalous events. At these facilities, SCPs are held captive and studied to develop better containment methods. The Foundation's laboratory research projects frequently exploit "D-class personnel", disposable human test subjects (usually unwitting convict prisoners) acquired from around the world, forcing them into performing slave labor and participating in experiments with potentially dangerous SCPs in order to avoid risking the safety of the Foundation's employees.

In the SCP fictional universe, apart from the Foundation itself, there are numerous rival organizations (collectively known as Groups of Interest, or GOIs) actively involved with the paranormal world. Examples include the Chaos Insurgency, a terrorist splinter group of ex-Foundation defectors who capture and weaponize SCPs; the Global Occult Coalition (GOC), a secret paramilitary agency of the United Nations specialized in destroying supernatural threats instead of containing them; and the Serpent's Hand, a militant group which advocates for the rights of anomalous beings, resisting both the Foundation's and GOC's efforts to suppress paranormal activity worldwide. Other GOIs seek to exploit anomalies by producing or selling them for profit, or using them to serve their own religious, political, or ideological goals.

=== Examples of SCPs ===
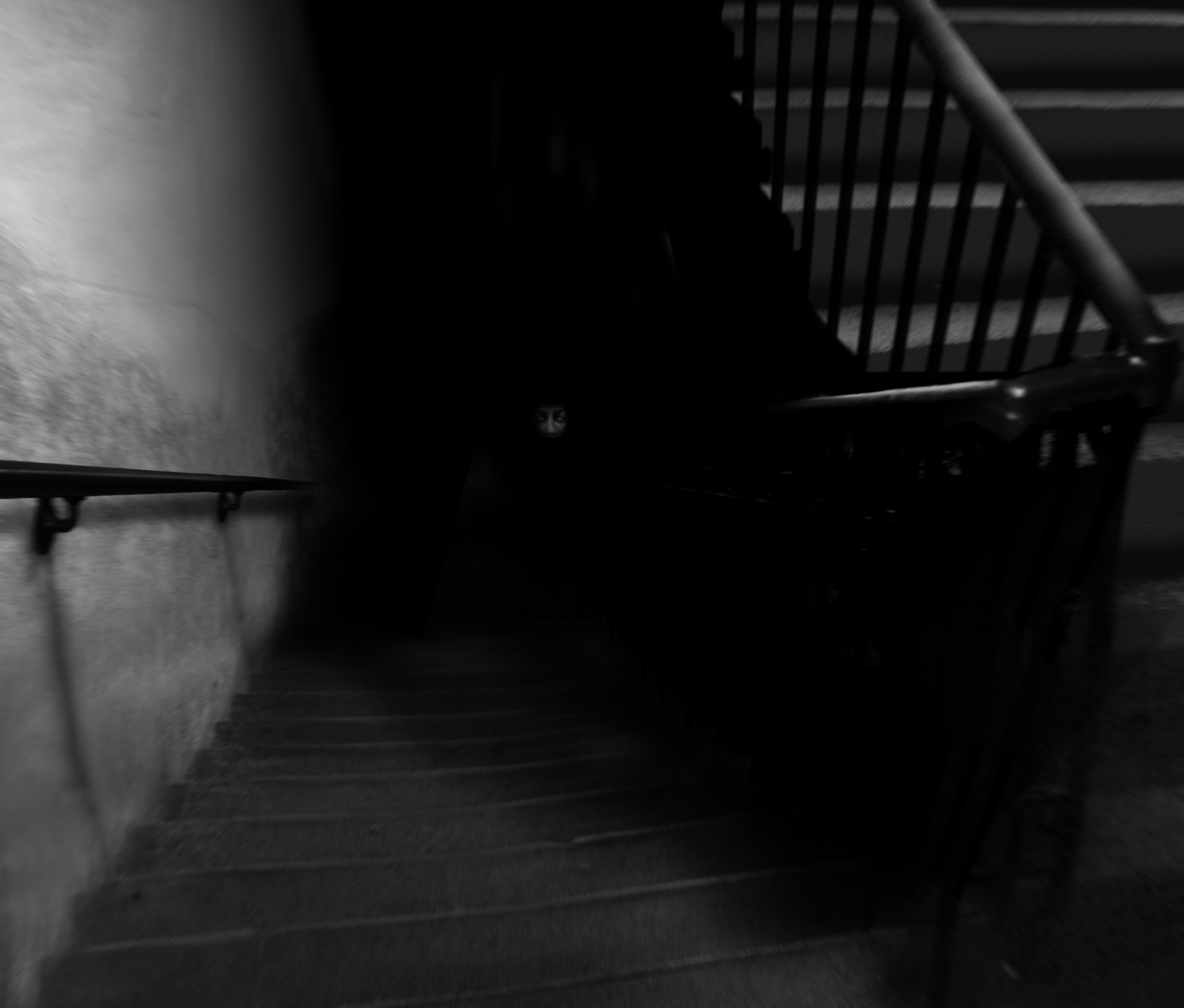
The illustration accompanying the work "SCP-087" on the SCP Wiki

- "SCP-049" depicts a humanoid resembling a medieval plague doctor. Though generally docile, the entity will kill those it believes have "the pestilence" and re-animate their corpses. James Potvin of ScreenRant called it the perfect entry for SCP beginners.
- "SCP-055" depicts a memory-erasing "anti-meme" anomaly that causes anyone who examines it to forget its existence, thus making its true nature unknown; its characteristics are indescribable except in terms of what it is not.
- "SCP-087" depicts a light-inhibiting staircase that appears to descend infinitely and its inhabitant, a disembodied floating face without a mouth, nostrils, or pupils which chases after anyone walking down the stairs.
- "SCP-096" depicts a tall, thin, seemingly immortal humanoid with extreme scopophobia, which causes it great psychological distress. The creature will hunt down and kill anyone who sees its face, whether in person or in a photographic reproduction.
- "SCP-173" depicts a humanoid statue composed of rebar, concrete, and spray paint. It is immobile when directly observed, but attacks people and breaks their neck when line of sight with it is broken. It is extremely fast, to the point where it can move multiple meters when the observer blinks. SCP-173 is the first SCP ever written, and it inspired the rest of the SCP Wiki and its fictional universe. The entry was originally illustrated with a picture of an artwork by Izumi Katō, but this was removed for copyright reasons.
- "SCP-294" depicts a coffee vending machine that can dispense anything that can exist in liquid form—including certain abstract concepts. Regardless of the physical or chemical properties of the substance chosen, the machine's paper cups appear to suffer no damage from the substances dispensed into them.
- "SCP-426" depicts a sentient toaster that can only be referred to in the first person.
- "SCP-999" depicts a gelatinous slime mold–like creature that smells similar to whatever is the most comforting smell to the person it makes contact with. It has a friendly personality and induces positive emotions on contact with humans and other organisms; as such, it is employed as a tool by the SCP Foundation.
- "SCP-1171" depicts a home that has windows covered in condensation; by writing in the condensation on the glass, it is possible to communicate with an extra-dimensional entity whose windows are likewise covered in condensation. This entity bears xenophobic enmity against humans, but does not know that the Foundation members are humans.
- "SCP-1247" depicts a man who perceives all animals he sees as the actor Shia LaBeouf.
- "SCP-1609" depicts a sentient pile of wood chip mulch, fabric scraps, and nails. It teleports into the lungs of individuals displaying aggressive behavior towards it, those wearing formal attire (primarily military), and anyone who is otherwise identified by it to be a threat. It was previously a benevolent chair that teleported to nearby individuals who needed to sit down, and was reduced to its current state after being destroyed in a woodchipper by the Global Occult Coalition.
- "SCP-3008" depicts an derelict IKEA store whose main entrance leads to a seemingly infinite, labyrinthine pocket dimension. The SCP format serves as a frame story for the main epistolary work: the journal of a prospective customer trapped within the endless store interior. He and other victims—who are implied to be from parallel dimensions—make rudimentary fortifications to defend against the store's monstrous inhabitants, tall, faceless humanoid creatures wearing IKEA employee uniforms. These creatures become violently aggressive towards humans when the store's interior lights turn off at "night".

== History ==
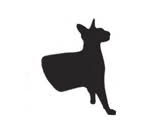
Logo of the SCP Wiki used from 2008 to 2010, representing SCP-529, the front half of a cat, which behaves as a normal cat in all ways except in that it lacks a back half

The SCP Foundation originated in the "paranormal" /x/ forum of 4chan in June 2007, where the very first SCP file, SCP-173, was posted by an anonymous user (later identified as Wesley "Moto42" Williams), accompanied by an image of the sculpture "Untitled 2004" by Japanese artist Izumi Katō. Although displeased with the unlicensed use of his art, Katō allowed the use of the photo explicitly for the noncommercial purposes of the community. Though SCP-173 was initially a stand-alone short story, many additional SCP files were created shortly after; those new SCPs copied SCP-173's style and were set within the same fictional universe.

In July 2008, the SCP Wiki was transferred to its current Wikidot website after the wiki hosting service EditThis switched to a paid model. New Wikidot wikis, by default, made use of the CC BY-SA 3.0 license at the time. The SCP staff therefore "accidentally" adopted this license for SCP media. By 2009, a large number of articles had been written but the quality of those posts was often poor. A mass edit conducted from September to December of that year saw every article reviewed and a large number "decommissioned". A repository of the removed articles is preserved at SCP Classic. The development of evaluation processes, including the sharing of ideas and constructive criticism, has since allowed the community to maintain a high quality level for new articles.

The community continued to grow and opened branches in additional languages through the early 2010s. In particular, a surge of new members arrived in 2012 after the launch of SCP – Containment Breach. The original SCP-173 text was released into the creative commons by its author explicitly in 2013, in an effort to address the uncertain license status of some earlier material. This debate over licensing led to a dispute between the English and Russian language branches in 2017, which briefly shut down the Russian version.

In 2022, an article in American Journalism suggested that the SCP Foundation may have become the largest collaborative writing project in history.

== Writing style ==
On the SCP Wiki, the majority of works are stand-alone articles detailing the "Special Containment Procedures" of a given SCP object. In a typical article, an SCP object is assigned a unique identification number (e.g. "SCP-173") and a "containment class" (ranging from Safe to Euclid, Keter, and Thaumiel) (Note: Commonly used object classes include: Safe: SCPs tame enough to be trivially contained, such as most inanimate yet paranormal objects.; Euclid: SCPs requiring substantial effort to contain, such as living organisms.; Keter: Difficult or dangerous SCPs that either cannot be fully contained or that require overly complex and elaborate procedures to contain.; Thaumiel: SCPs that are used to contain other SCPs and/or are beneficial to the Foundation.; Several hundred SCPs use an unofficial classification system that displays information in addition to containment difficulty.) based on the difficulty of containing it. The documentation then outlines proper containment procedures and safety measures, and a description of the SCP object in question. Addenda (such as images, research data, interviews, history, or status updates) may also be attached to the document. The reports are written in a scientific tone and often censor words with black redaction bars and "data expunged" markings, to give the in-universe impression of sensitive information not to be disclosed to lesser-privileged Foundation staff. As of July 2026, articles exist for over 10,400 SCP objects; (Note: Including deliberately humorous "joke" SCP objects, SCP objects that were archived in lieu of deletion, and translations of SCPs from foreign language branches.) new articles are written and published frequently by contributors.

The SCP Wiki also contains over 6,300 short stories referred to as "Foundation Tales". The stories are set within the larger SCP universe, and often focus on the exploits of various Foundation staff members, SCP entities, and objects, among other recurring characters and settings. Gregory Burkart, writing for Blumhouse Productions, noted that some of the Foundation Tales had a dark and bleak tone, while others were "surprisingly light-hearted". The works on the SCP Wiki have been described as science fiction, urban fantasy, horror, and creepypasta.

The SCP universe has neither a central canon nor the ability to establish one due to its community-oriented nature, but stories on the wiki are often linked together to create larger narratives. Contributors have the ability to create "canons", which are clusters of SCPs and Foundation Tales with similar locations, characters, or central plots; many of these canons have hub pages that explain their basic concept and provide information such as timelines and character lists.

== Community ==
The current Wikidot website contains numerous standard wiki features such as keyword searches and article lists. The wiki also contains a news hub, guides for writers and a central discussion forum. The wiki is moderated by staff teams; each team is responsible for a different function such as community outreach and discipline. Wikidot users are required to submit an application before they are allowed to post content. Every article on the wiki is assigned a discussion page, where members can evaluate and provide constructive criticism on submitted stories. The discussion pages are frequently used by authors to improve their stories. Members also have the ability to "upvote" articles they like and to "downvote" articles they dislike; articles that receive too many net downvotes are deleted. Writers from the Daily Dot and Bustle have noted that the website maintains strict quality control standards, and that sub-par content tends to be quickly removed. Authors who have written for the site include Max Landis, qntm, and Adrian Hon.

The Wikidot website routinely holds creative writing contests to encourage submissions. The first of these was held in 2011 to decide which article would be assigned the "SCP-1000" label. There have since been additional competitions; for example, in 2014, the SCP Wiki held a "Dystopia Contest" in which its members were encouraged to submit writings about the Foundation set in a bleak or degraded world.

Apart from the original English wiki, 15 other official language branches exist, and some of their articles have been translated into English. The Wanderer's Library is a sister site and spin-off of the SCP Wiki. It uses the same setting as the SCP universe, but is made up of fantastical stories rather than scientific reports. The SCP community also maintains a role-playing site, a forum on Reddit, and accounts on Facebook, Twitter, and Bluesky.

== Legal disputes ==
=== Trademark dispute ===
The SCP Foundation website and its contents are under a Creative Commons license, and none of the characters or assets associated with it are trademarked by the Foundation itself. In 2019, a Russian resident named Andrey Duksin filed a trademark for the name and logo of the SCP Foundation. Although the Creative Commons license grants the right to sell merchandise based on the SCP intellectual property, Duksin used his trademark in Russia to suppress competition by stopping others from selling merchandise within Russia. In addition, Duksin threatened to shut down the official Russian website of the SCP Foundation. In 2020, the SCP Foundation launched a fundraiser to raise funds to combat Duksin legally, with an initial goal of $50,000. Fans and members of the community, including the YouTuber Markiplier, contributed $140,000 to the fundraiser.

In November 2021, the Russian Federal Antimonopoly Service ruled against Duksin. It found that he did not commission or create the SCP name or logo, the rights to them had not been transferred to him, and that his actions may constitute an act of unfair competition. However, his trademark continued to stand in Russia. An article in Case Western Law Review came to the conclusion that the court's actions were broadly in line with Russian indulgence of trademark and patent trolls, as Russia does not usually deregister illegitimately obtained trademarks. The SCP Wiki successfully appealed in April 2022, and Duksin's trademark was ultimately cancelled that October.

=== SCP-173 image removal ===
The original SCP-173, posted in 2007, used an image of the sculpture Untitled 2004 by the artist Izumi Katō, which was photographed by Keisuke Yamamoto. The creator of the post, Wesley "Moto42" Williams, did not have the rights to either the sculpture or the photograph that depicted it. Beginning in 2013 both the Japanese and English branches attempted to make contact with Katō to ask permission, but they received no reply. The English staff were eventually able to contact him in September 2014, and he "reluctantly" allowed the community to use the image for non-commercial purposes. He announced that he would take legal action if someone attempted to use it for a commercial purpose.

The image remained on the site with a warning attached until February 2022, when staff made the decision to remove it. The SCP Foundation said on Twitter that the artistic vision of Izumi Katō had been "forcibly hijacked" by the statue's association with SCP, and that they could not "fully undo the damage done". At the request of Wesley Williams, a new image was not placed in the article, so that readers would have to imagine it themselves. Many original interpretations of SCP-173 were created by the community in the wake of the decision.

=== Tenth V/H/S installment ===
In July 2026, a tenth installment to the V/H/S franchise was announced, titled V/H/S: SCP, slated for release in 2027. Film production company A24 picked up the film for distribution, collaborating with Spooky Pictures and Image Nation Studios.

The SCP Wiki released a statement that no writer or staff member had been contacted regarding the film, and that no communication of their own to the filmmakers or producers has been successful. The statement also ascertained that A24 "does not and cannot have any exclusive rights to anything related to the SCP Foundation". Because the SCP Foundation project exists under the CC BY-SA 3.0 license, any derivative work centered around the SCP Foundation must be released under the same license, meaning that A24 could not distribute the film in a manner that prevents it from being freely copied (e.g, any individual could upload the entirety of A24's film to YouTube where others could watch it for free with no legal repercussions).

On October 11, 2026, the statement by the staff of the SCP Wiki was updated to say that Spooky Pictures has contacted them and a meeting has been arranged.

On October 16, 2026, the statement by the staff of the SCP Wiki was updated to say that they had an "amicable and productive meeting with representatives from Spooky Pictures and A24". They've said that they remain in conversation, but have not yet committed to a resolution.

== Reception ==
The SCP Foundation has received largely positive reviews. Michelle Starr of CNET praised the creepy nature of the stories. Gavia Baker-Whitelaw, writing for the Daily Dot, praised the originality of the wiki and described it as the "most uniquely compelling horror writing on the Internet". She noted that the series rarely contained gratuitous gore. Rather, the horror of the series was often established through the reports' "pragmatic" and "deadpan" style, as well as through the inclusion of detail. Lisa Suhay, writing for the Christian Science Monitor, also noted the SCP Wiki's "tongue-in-cheek style".

Alex Eichler, writing for io9, noted that the series had varying levels of quality and that some of the reports were dull or repetitive. However, he praised the SCP stories for not becoming overly dark, and for containing more light-hearted reports. Additionally, he praised the wide variety of concepts covered in the report and said that the wiki contained writings that would appeal to all readers. Leigh Alexander, writing for The Guardian, noted that the wiki's voting system allows readers to easily locate works which "the community thinks are best and most scary."

Winston Cook-Wilson, writing for Inverse, compared the SCP stories to the writings of American author H. P. Lovecraft. Like Lovecraft, SCP casefiles generally lack action sequences and are written in a pseudo-academic tone. Cook-Wilson argued that both Lovecraft's works and those of the SCP Wiki were strengthened by the tensions between their detached scientific tone and the unsettling, horrific nature of the stories being told.

Bryan Alexander, writing in The New Digital Storytelling, stated that the SCP Foundation is possibly "the most advanced achievement of wiki storytelling" due to the large-scale and recurring process through which the wiki's user-base creates literary content.

== Media inspired by the SCP Foundation ==
The works present on the SCP Foundation website have been the subject of numerous independent adaptations and inspired some original works:

=== Adaptations of the SCP universe ===
Literature

- SCP-5000 Why – The Graphic Novel (2021) is a 120-page graphic novel adaptation of SCP-5000 – Why? written by Tanhony and illustrated by Drdobermann. The novel focuses on technician Pietro Wilson surviving in an alternate universe where, for unknown reasons, the SCP Foundation has declared war against humanity and is releasing SCP objects to ensure human extinction. Funded through Kickstarter, the novel was published by Discordia Publishing in August 2021.
- SCP Comics Series (2023–2025) is a series of one-shot horror graphic novels published by Aloha Comics under their ParaBooks imprint that focus on specific SCPs or Mobile Task Forces. The series includes "We Who Poke With Sticks", "The Plague Doctor", "Red Sea Object", "Old Man", "Expunged Data Released", and "Reluctant Dimension Hopper". These oneshots were released as part of a book set funded through Kickstarter.
- SCP Foundation: Iris Through the Looking-Glass (2018–2020) is a light novel series written by Akira and illustrated by Sidu. The book focuses on a boy who is kidnapped by the SCP Foundation after he sees a picture of Iris Thompson, a girl designated as SCP-105, in every book he opens; the boy and Iris are forced to cooperate to escape the Foundation. The novel series began publication in Japan in September 2018, and was released by Seven Seas Entertainment in North America in January 2020.
- There Is No Antimemetics Division (2021) is an SCP sci-fi horror story written and self-published by Sam "qntm" Hughes. The novel focuses on the concept of "antimemes", ideas and entities that censor themselves through memory loss, data corruption, and other anomalous means, and more specifically the invasion of an antimemetic entity that feeds on information.

Theater

- Welcome to the Ethics Committee (2014) is a stage play that was performed in Dublin at the Smock Alley Theatre in October 2014. The play focused on the SCP Foundation's Ethics Committee, a body that tries to limit unethical containment procedures.

Video games

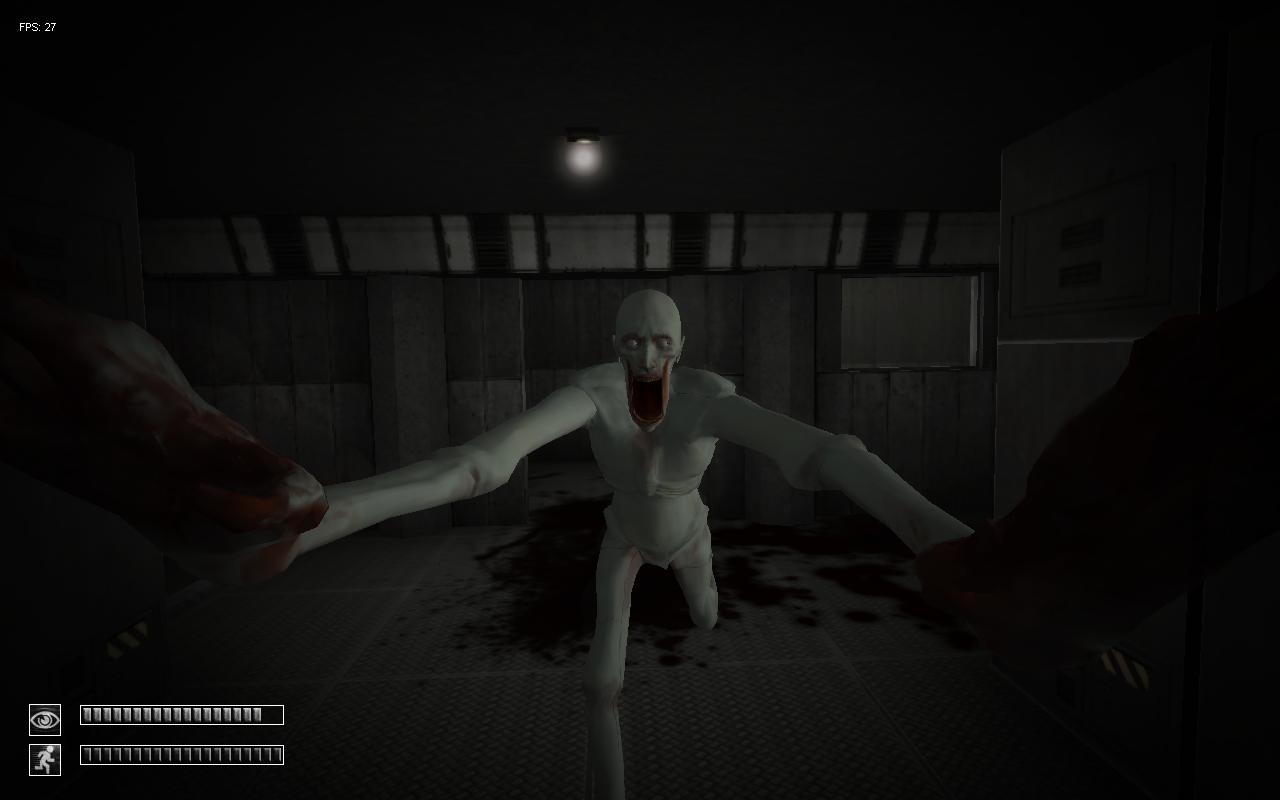
SCP-096 in a screenshot from SCP – Containment Breach

- SCP-087 (2012) is a short horror game about walking down the stairs of SCP-087.
- SCP – Containment Breach (2012), one of the most popular games based on the SCP Foundation, was released by Finnish developer Joonas Rikkonen in 2012. The game includes a blink function, which makes the player close their eyes and allows SCP-173 to approach.
- SCP: Secret Laboratory (2017) is a multiplayer game based on Containment Breach. Players have the option of playing different roles.
- SCP: 5K (2022), formerly named SCP: Pandemic, is a multiplayer co-op first-person shooter in development by Affray Interactive.
- SCP: Secret Files (2022) is an episodic horror adventure game in development by GameZoo Studios. Each chapter of the game covers a different excursion into the SCP Foundation's operations.
- Go Home Annie (2024) is a horror adventure game developed by Misfit Village featuring an original narrative set in the SCP Foundation universe. It was released in 2024.
- SCP: Fragmented Minds (2025) is a first person action adventure game set on Site-113, an SCP Foundation site on Mars. Funded by a Kickstarter and developed by HST Studios, the game launched Chapter 1 in January 2025 and Chapter 2 in April 2026, with two more chapters planned for release later.
- The Store is Closed (TBA) is an upcoming multiplayer survival game set in SCP-3008, an infinite IKEA-like store. The project had a successful Kickstarter in 2022, and entered into a closed alpha test that November. The game faced legal threats from IKEA which led to some graphical changes.

Web videos

- Confinement (2017–2019) is an animated black comedy horror web series on YouTube, created by the animator "Lord Bung". The series focuses on the misadventures of Connor, an immortal human SCP prisoner whose anomalous ability to instantaneously resurrect himself from any cause of death is frequently exploited by the Foundation, who often use him as a D-class test subject to interact with various highly dangerous SCPs.
- SCP: Overlord (2020) is a 35-minute action horror thriller short film on YouTube, directed by Stephen Hancock and written by Evan Muir. The plot involves a team of Foundation agents raiding and investigating a house occupied by a local cult, which performed occult rituals that have resulted in anomalous activity.
- There Is No Antimemetics Division (2024), based on the serial novel of the same name, is a four-part short series on YouTube, written and directed by Andrea Joshua Asnicar and Jenna Cosgrove.

Podcasts

- Find Us Alive (2019–present) is an audio drama series made by production company Hodgepodge that follows a group of Foundation staff members trapped inside an extra-dimensional Foundation Site.

Film

- V/H/S: SCP (2027) is an upcoming film in the V/H/S series based on the SCP Foundation. The film will feature an anthology of found-footage stories documenting encounters with various SCPs.
- Untitled SCP film by Neon (2027).

=== Other original works ===
Video games

- Lobotomy Corporation (2018), a management video game by Project Moon, was released in April 2018. Inspired by the SCP Foundation, the titular Lobotomy Corporation contains and harvests energy from supernatural "Abnormalities", and handling containment breaches is a major aspect of the gameplay.
- Control (2019), a video game created by Remedy Entertainment, was first revealed at E3 2018 and released in August 2019. The video game was heavily influenced by the SCP Foundation, and is centered on a fictional Federal Bureau of Control that collects mundane objects imbued with paranormal influence to study and keep secure.
- Lethal Company (2023), a cooperative survival horror video game created by solo developer Zeekerss, was released in October 2023. The developer drew upon existing mythos and monsters from the SCP universe for use in the horror game.

== See also ==
- The Backrooms – Fictional location
- Information hazard – Risk caused by disseminating information
- Lovecraftian horror – Subgenre of horror
- Men in black – Government agents who supposedly intimidate UFO witnesses
- Odd Squad – Canadian educational comedy television series, with a similar premise
- Trevor Henderson – Canadian horror artist (born 1986) known for creating viral internet fictional monsters like Siren Head, Cartoon Cat, and Long Horse
- Warehouse 13 – American science fiction television series (2009–2014), with a similar premise
- The X-Files – American science fiction–thriller media franchise
