= Izumi Katō (artist) =

Japanese contemporary artist (born 1969)

- 加藤 泉
- Born: 1969 (age 56–57); Yasugi, Shimane, Japan
- Education: Musashino Art University
- Known for: Sculpting, painting
- Notable work: "Untitled 2004"
- Movement: Contemporary art
- Spouse: Naoko Kameyama
- Website: izumikato.com

Izumi Katō (Japanese: 加藤 泉, Hepburn: Katō Izumi; born 1969) is a Japanese contemporary artist, painter, and sculptor.

== Career ==
Katō was born in Shimane Prefecture. He attended Musashino Art University and graduated from the Department of Oil Painting in 1992. He would first enter the public eye in 1995, with his paintings debuting at group exhibitions in Tokyo.

Inspired by Francis Bacon, Vincent van Gogh, and Itō Jakuchū, most of Katō's sculptures draw from the meaning of life, often resembling embryos or fetuses, and his works are intentionally left untitled to challenge the audience. He made his international debut as he went into sculpting around 2004. Katō's sculptures would be featured at Art Tower Mito's contemporary art gallery, then the Japan Society Gallery's exhibit in New York City in 2005. In 2007, he was discovered by American curator Robert Storr, who noted that Katō's works were more abrasive and edgier than most Japanese works, which led to Storr inviting Katō to be the first young Japanese artist at the 52nd Venice Biennale.

=== Untitled 2004 ===
Untitled 2004
- 無題 2004 (Japanese)
- Artist: Izumi Katō
- Year: 2004
- Medium: Wood, acrylic, charcoal
- Dimensions: 205 cm × 56 cm × 52 cm (81 in × 22 in × 20 in)
- Owner: Takahashi Ryutaro Collection
- Website: izumikato.com/filter/sculpture/Untitled-2004

"Untitled 2004" (無題 2004, Mudai Nisen'yon) is a painted wood sculpture, currently owned by the Takahashi Ryutaro Collection, that appears to depict a baby-like creature pressed against the wall with its large head turned to the side.

On the internet, Keisuke Yamamoto's photograph of the sculpture was used in the 2007 4chan post that described it as "SCP-173": the first entry in what became the SCP Foundation writing project. In 2014, Katō responded to the image's derivative use, reluctantly permitting its use by the SCP Foundation as long as he is credited and the work is not used for commercial purposes. In 2022, the SCP Foundation removed the photograph to avoid possible legal issues as it did not comply with their Creative Commons license. The entry's original author requested that the image not be replaced with anything, in order to let people envision "SCP-173" for themselves.

== Personal life ==
Katō is married to fellow artist Naoko Kameyama. They have children.
