= Puelo Bajo Airport =

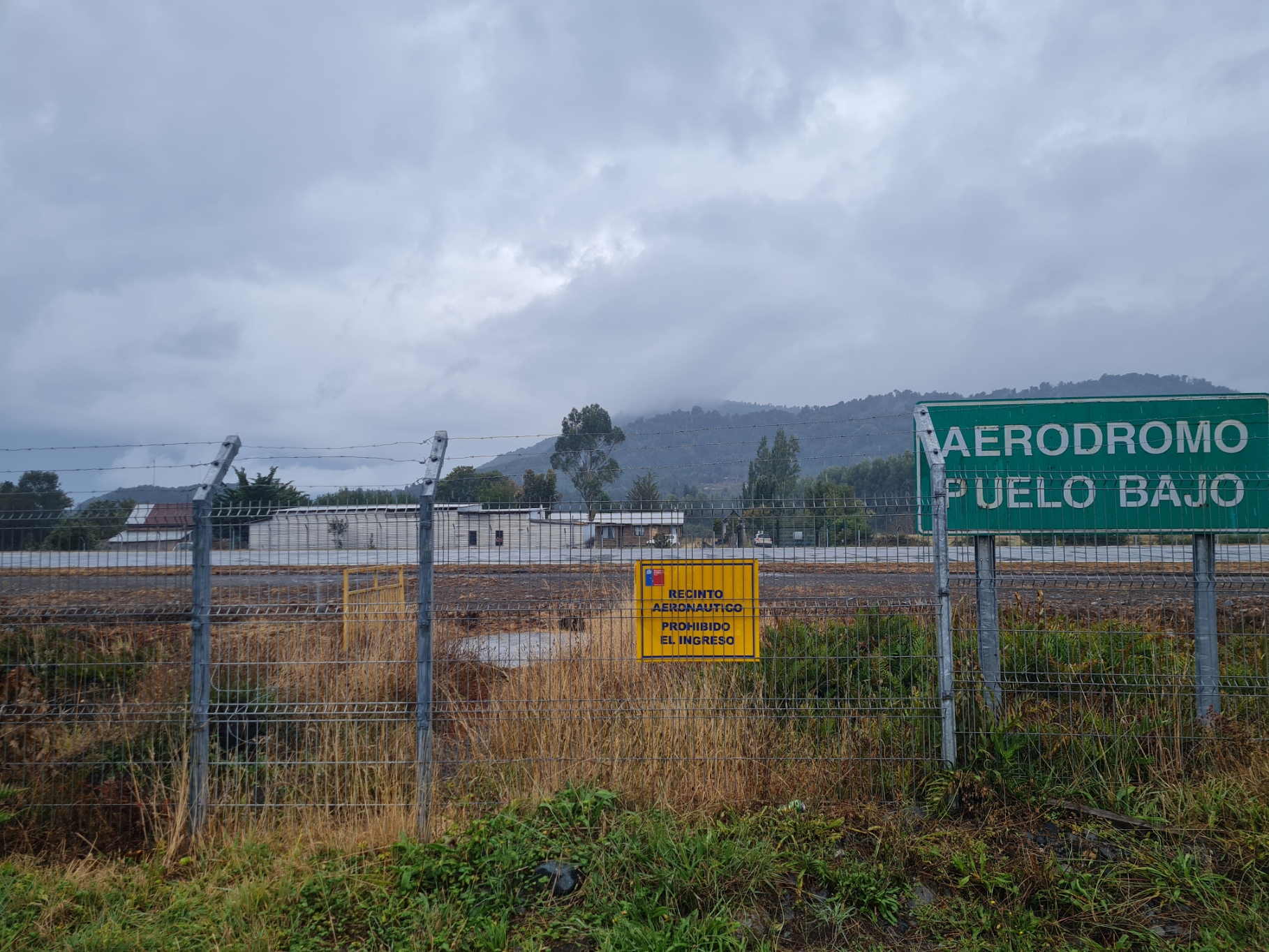
- IATA: none; ICAO: SCPB

Summary
- Airport type: Public
- Serves: Puelo Bajo (es), Chile
- Elevation AMSL: 120 ft / 37 m
- Coordinates: 41°39′30″S 72°18′00″W

Map
- Location of Puelo Bajo Airport in Chile

Runways
Direction	Length		Surface
Direction	m	ft	Surface
06/24	615	2,018	Asphalt
- Source: Landings.com Google Maps GCM

Puelo Bajo Airport (Spanish: Aeropuerto de Puelo Bajo), (ICAO: SCPB) is an airport serving Puelo Bajo (es), a village in the Los Lagos Region of Chile. The village is near the Puelo River, which flows into the Reloncaví Sound.

There are hills north and south of the runway.

== See also ==
- Transport in Chile
- List of airports in Chile
