= Masquerade (trope) =

Fantasy and speculative fiction trope involving a hidden society within the real world

A masquerade is a literary trope that is used to conceal the identity and certain characteristics of a figure. This concealment has the effect of highlighting some unique or noteworthy aspect of a character or situation, despite its suggested intention of subtlety. There exists the true nature of a character or situation alongside the image that is outwardly displayed and perceived by others in that universe, which can create a layered complexity that adds depth and dimension to the narrative. Common examples include preventing non-magic users from discovering the existence of magic in a setting, or hiding the existence of vampires or werewolves from most of humanity.

The historical traces of this term extend deeply throughout history and its influence on the texts in which appears becomes increasingly more dynamic and a variety of genres take advantage of the masquerade trope. It is popularly employed in the fantasy and superhero genres, but there are other instances in which it can be found across various fictional works.

== Etymology ==
The late 16th century English word masquerade is reported to have origins in the French word mascarade, the Spanish word mascarada, and the Italian word mascarata, all of which relate to the masking of one's appearance or identity. Contemporary uses and meaning of the word has become more broad, but initial uses only served to define the literal act of donning a mask or in the context of a masquerade ball.

== Usage ==
The use of masquerade tropes is extensive and spans across many different sub-genres of fictional work. Evidence of masks being used as a way of marking and emphasizing certain character traits first surfaces in early Greek and Roman theatrical works. This motif evolves and becomes more complex at the beginning of the Middle Ages with the introduction of the separation of character and identity of an individual by Augustine of Hippo and experienced further growth beyond this time period.

Its use as a more advanced literary device begins to emerge particularly in pieces produced in the 18th century and many significant stages of its growth can be traced to this period. However, there can be examples found across a vast majority of different types of media, and is not limited to only written literature. Some have pointed to how characterization is further built and developed as a result of using masquerade tropes. It constructs more dimension around characters, in some situations attributing conflicting traits to a single individual, which leads readers to regard them as more complex and unique rather than a predictable figure.

=== 18th century literature ===
This trope was particularly prevalent in fictional works produced in the 18th century. Its implementation has been discussed as a way to explore the various social constraints placed on the authors and their own realities. The masquerade trope is also often pointed to as a way of expressing or commenting on different forms of femininity. As its use increased the masquerade became associated heavily with themes of female promiscuity and sexual freedom.

Initial signs of this trope appearing have been found as early as 1673 with John Dryden's Marriage à la mode, which had continued and increased adaptations of the original playwright through the mid-1700's. The focus placed on masquerade is comparatively primitive and sparse in this original production. However, it has been considered to be the inspiration of the emergence of various subsequent performances, each of which have provided contributions to the formation of the contemporary masquerade trope.

There have been several notable women writers that have utilized this trope as a way of speaking on and representing both the expectations and reality of the feminine experience. Eliza Haywood is one of many known for expressing this perspective and is often referenced when analyzing this theme. Her works tend to highlight female characters, who are otherwise oppressed by socio-economic normative expectations, explore their gender identity and sexuality in an uninhibited way as a result of the masquerade. The false identity that is adopted by these characters allows them to act in ways that would be considered atypical or even prohibited. Women writers such as Haywood have been known for cultivating this relationship between using the mask and themes of femininity, establishing greater associations of promiscuity and sexual freedoms surrounding masquerades more broadly.

=== Fantasy ===
Commonly used in speculative fiction, a group of supernatural or otherwise extraordinary people will hide their existence from the mainstream society in their respective setting. These hidden groups are sometimes referred to as a "wainscot society", wherein they live parallel to mainstream society in a covert manner, but overall remain their own distinct entity with their own culture.

In a fantasy context, it can mean that magic is hidden, whether in secret locations, such as Diagon Alley in Harry Potter, or by magical forces, such as the Mist in Percy Jackson, or a glamour placed on individuals.

That is typically done to avoid some type of mass panic that would result in the destruction of the magical world by far more numerous normal people fearing the unknown. Masquerade societies may seek to hide this information from outsiders, or they may be disbelieved due to ignorance, conspiracies, or consensus reality. In works of fantasy with horror aspects, such as H. P. Lovecraft's Cthulhu Mythos, the Buffyverse, or White Wolf Games' World of Darkness setting, the majority's ignorance of the fantastical elements of their world will be portrayed as being to their own benefit.

The trope is used not only in fantasy but also in many science fiction and even superhero stories. A common device to keep hidden events from the masses in science fiction is the existence of aliens, such as in the Men in Black series. The secret identities of superheroes are also a type of masquerade, and the only superheroes that show their true identity are ones who can keep their family safe or have nothing to protect.

The masquerade trope assists writers by adding additional tension to the story, as well as helping the story appear plausible. It also saves the author from needing to write an alternate history in order to explain the existence of magic.

== Examples ==
- Marriage à la mode by John Dryden
- The Masqueraders by Eliza Haywood
- Harry Potter series by J.K. Rowling
- Neverwhere and other works by Neil Gaiman
- Percy Jackson and the Olympians series by Rick Riordan
- Cthulhu Mythos by H. P. Lovecraft
- Buffyverse
- Vampire: The Masquerade and other tabletop roleplaying games in the World of Darkness setting created by White Wolf Games
- Men in Black (film series)
- Methuselah's Children by Robert A. Heinlein

== See also ==
- Modern fantasy
- Kayfabe: the equivalent term in circuses, carnivals, and professional wrestling
- Maskirovka: Russian military doctrine using elaborate deceptions
