= SCP – Containment Breach =

2012 survival horror video game

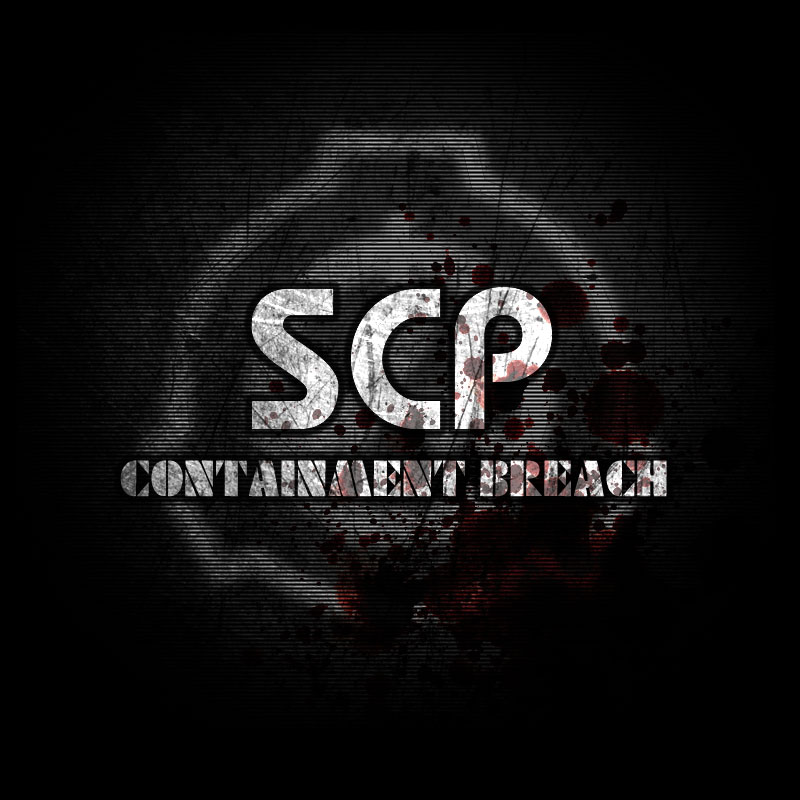
- Original author: Joonas "Regalis" Rikkonen
- Developer: Undertow Games
- Release: 15 April 2012; 14 years ago
- Final release: 1.3.11 / 19 August 2018; 8 years ago
- Written in: Blitz3D (BlitzMax in 0.1 to 0.1.2)
- Engine: Blitz3D
- Operating system: Windows XP and later
- Platform: Microsoft Windows
- Size: 235.53 MB
- Standard: Windows XP or later. 1.2 GHz proccessor 256 MB RAM 300 MB available storage
- Available in: English
- Type: Survival horror video game
- License: CC BY-SA 3.0 (Except for SCP-173)
- Website: www.scpcbgame.com
- Repository: github.com/Regalis11/scpcb

SCP – Containment Breach is an indie horror game released on April 15, 2012 and developed by Finnish game developer Joonas "Regalis" Rikkonen. It is based on stories from the SCP Foundation collaborative writing project. In the game, the player controls a human test subject, who is trapped in a covert facility designed to study and contain supernatural and paranormal phenomena all individually designated as an "SCP". The player must escape the facility when it suffers a failure in its protocol, causing the Foundation to lose control over the containment of the facility's anomalous assets, many of which are a danger to the player.

== Gameplay ==
The game takes place in an SCP Foundation facility. The player controls one of the Foundation's many test subjects, known as a Class-D, who must navigate the facility while avoiding numerous threats. The facility’s layout is procedurally generated, creating a randomized map with each playthrough. This feature is controlled by a system called seed generation—a string of text that controls how a map generates.

The game uses a first-person perspective, where the player can move and sprint freely. Among the game’s attributes is the blink mechanic: the player has a blink meter that gradually depletes, forcing the player to blink at specific intervals. This mechanic directly relates to SCP-173, which can only move when it is not in the player's line of sight. If the player blinks or looks away, SCP-173 rapidly advances towards the player, and kills the player if it gets close enough.

The game has three difficulty levels, each with different save mechanics. On the easiest difficulty (Safe), the player can save at any point, and on the medium difficulty (Euclid), the player can save only at designated points. On the hardest difficulty (Keter), no saving is allowed (with the exception of the "Save & Quit" option), and the player faces permadeath.

The player can equip various items ranging from facility equipment to SCP objects, which are all capable of assisting or harming them. The player can also uncover documents, keycards, and terminals detailing select anomalies contained by the Foundation, as well as the schematics of the facility. These provide clues to the incidents leading up to and unfolding during the facility's lockdown, provide information on how to avoid and or recapture a few of the SCPs, and how the internals of the facility can be used to the advantage of the player. By using the keycards, the player can travel through otherwise inaccessible areas of the facility.

== Plot ==
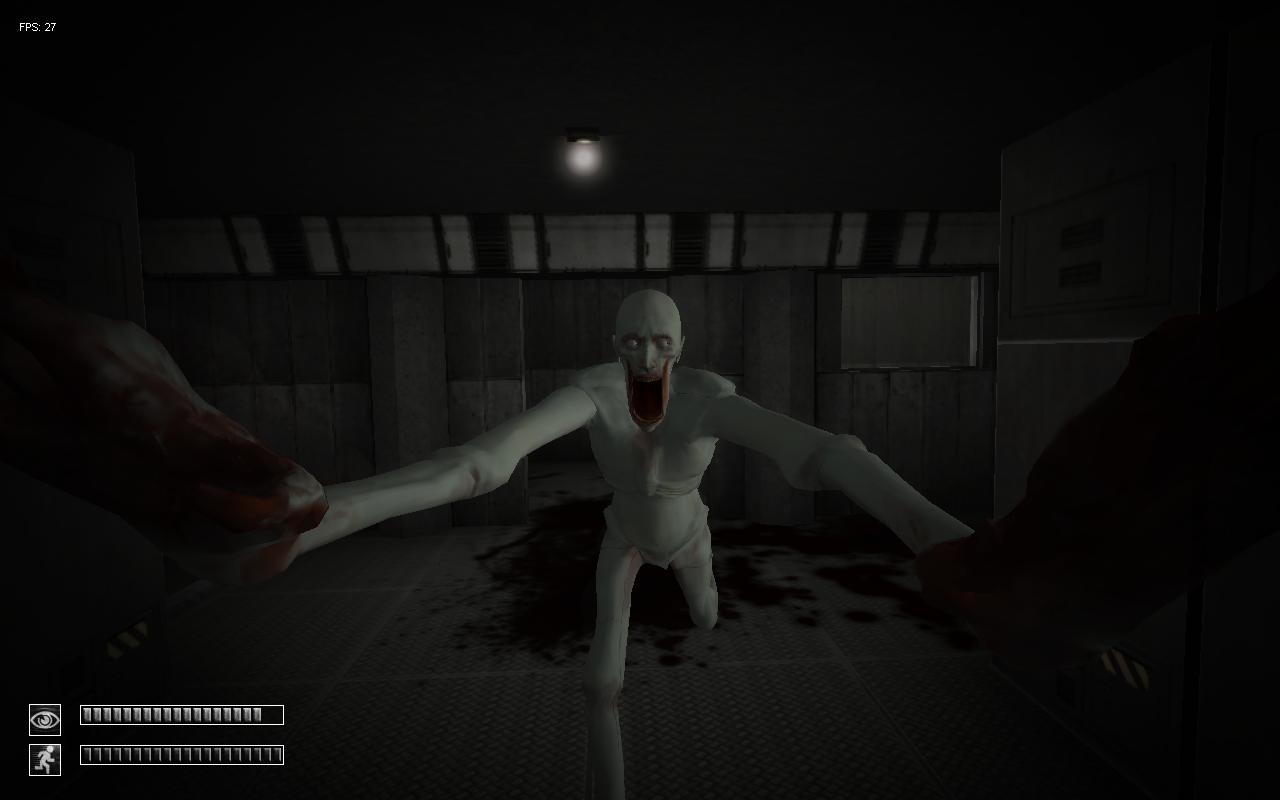
Screenshot of SCP-096 before killing the player

At the start of the game, the player, given the designation D-9341, is selected as a test subject for the study of SCP-173, a sculpture that moves and sporadically kills any creature in its vicinity when not being viewed by a living being. During the experiment, the facility's systems malfunction, allowing SCP-173 to escape its confinement and kill the other test subjects and Foundation personnel present. While venturing through the facility, the player encounters the anomalous creatures and phenomena it houses. Alongside SCP-173, the player will have to evade other SCPs, as well as a special operations force (referred to in-universe as a "Mobile Task Force") known as Epsilon-11 ("Nine-Tailed Fox"), deployed to restore functionality to the facility.

Multiple items can be uncovered that give insight into events that happen prior to the playable part of the game. Documents can be found that reveal the main character was formerly a researcher for the Foundation who, via memory erasure, was demoted to a disposable test subject for carrying out unauthorized experimentation with a phenomena known as the "Spiral Gestalt", which is used as an in-universe explanation for the player's ability to save, load, and respawn.

Readable computer monitors around the facility reveal that two double agents working for the Chaos Insurgency, a paramilitary organization in rivalry with the SCP Foundation, deliberately caused the containment breach. One agent known as Agent Skinner deliberately released SCP-106, a malevolent humanoid being that traps its victims in a pocket dimension of its make, where it has control over reality. The second agent, Dr. Maynard, used the distraction to access SCP-079, a sentient artificial intelligence system housed on an aged microcomputer. A readable transmission between Maynard and SCP-079 reveal that the agent gave SCP-079 direct control of most or all of the facility's functions, which allowed SCP-079 to release the other dangerous anomalies and cause the containment breach.

=== Endings ===
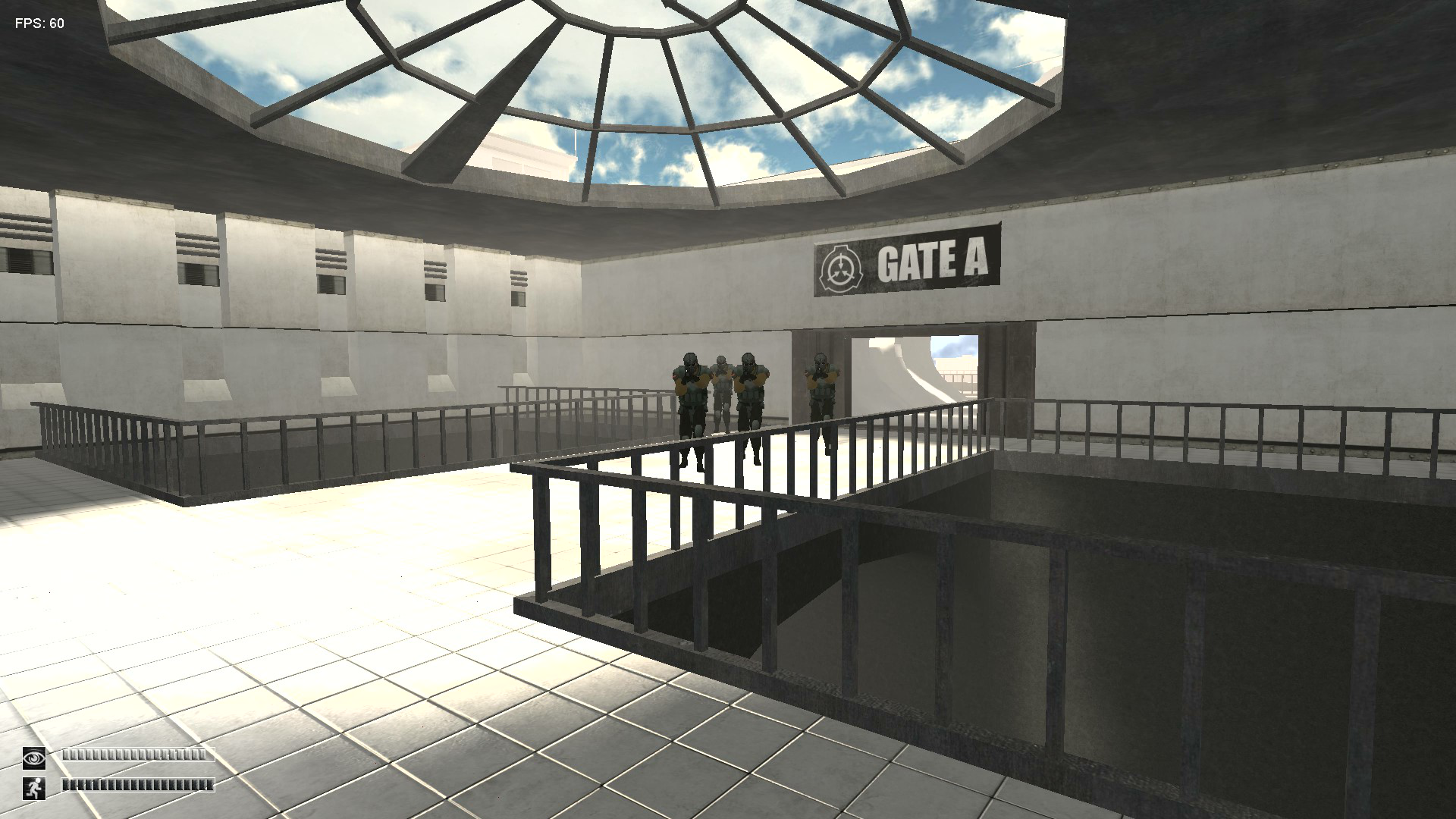
The player being encountered by MTF: Epsilon-11 in one of two endings that take place in Gate A.

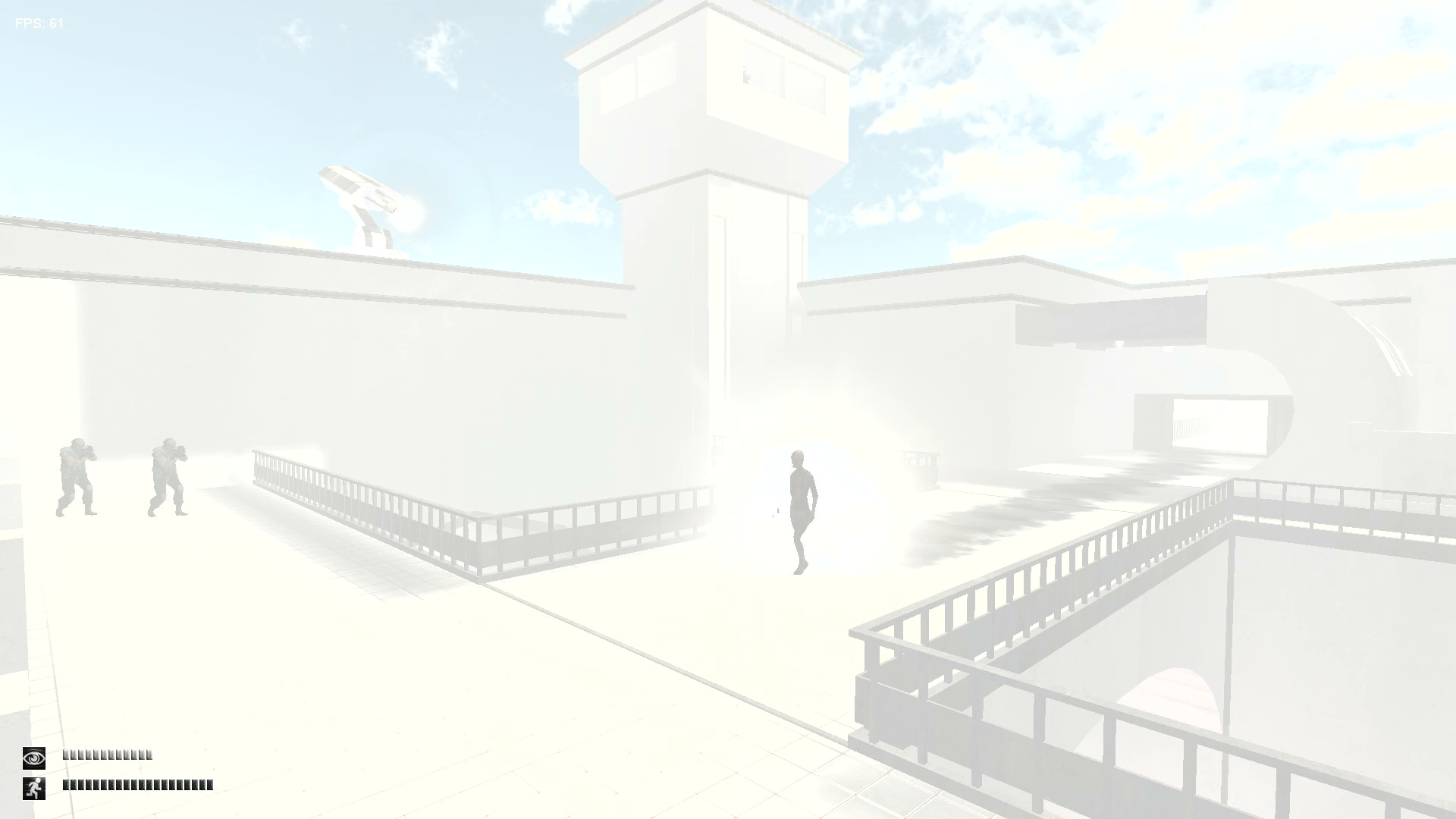
SCP-106 as it makes its way through the Gate A Walkway while being fired upon by a laser weapon known as an "H.I.D" turret

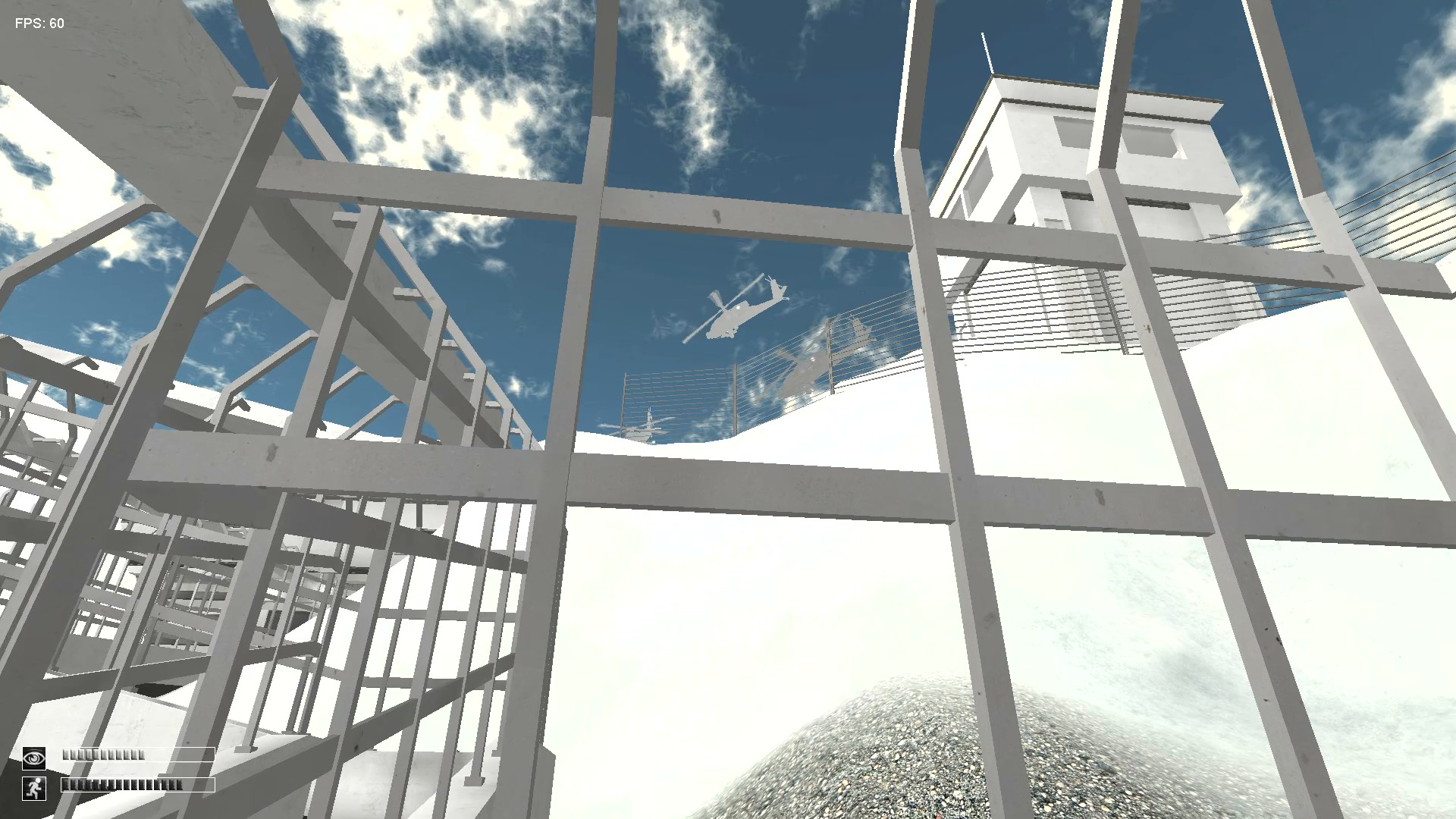
The set-piece of both variations of the Gate B ending, showing attack helicopters flying above SCP-682 as it wreaks havoc

The game offers four ending sequences that occur depending on the player's actions. Each takes place in one of the facility's two exits. A radio transmission at the end of the game, according to each ending sequence, provides further details of the aftermath of the player's actions.

In the primary exit (Gate A), one ending involves the player being detained by the aforementioned Nine-Tailed Fox personnel, and the player eventually being given an SCP designation after the Foundation realizes the player's character possesses the metaphysical supernatural property of being able to respawn himself after death.

The second Gate A ending will occur if the player did not re-contain SCP-106. It will spawn itself in the primary exit, allowing the player to make an escape while the Foundation attempts to incapacitate the entity. As the player escapes the facility through a service tunnel, operatives of the aforementioned Chaos Insurgency appear and take the player into their custody. The radio transmission that follows is between two Foundation members, one of which describing to the other an anomalous event that sealed pursuing Foundation personnel inside the tunnel.

The endings in the secondary exit (Gate B) both revolve around SCP-682, a borderline-indestructible reptilian monster with hyper-intelligence and an ever-lasting hatred for all life, escaping captivity. One variation of the secondary exit ending entails the facility's nuclear warheads being detonated in an attempt to eliminate SCP-682, destroying the facility and killing the player, though it is revealed that SCP-682 survived the blast.

However, if the player had previously deactivated the nuclear command and control of the facility, the facility's personnel continue their struggle in re-capturing SCP-682 without the warhead detonating, and arriving Mobile Task Force unit Cloud Nine agents will kill the player. In the ensuing radio transmission, a senior Foundation member questions how a D-Class managed to get as far through the facility as they did, as Foundation protocol during containment breaches is to cull all D-Class personnel.

== Development ==
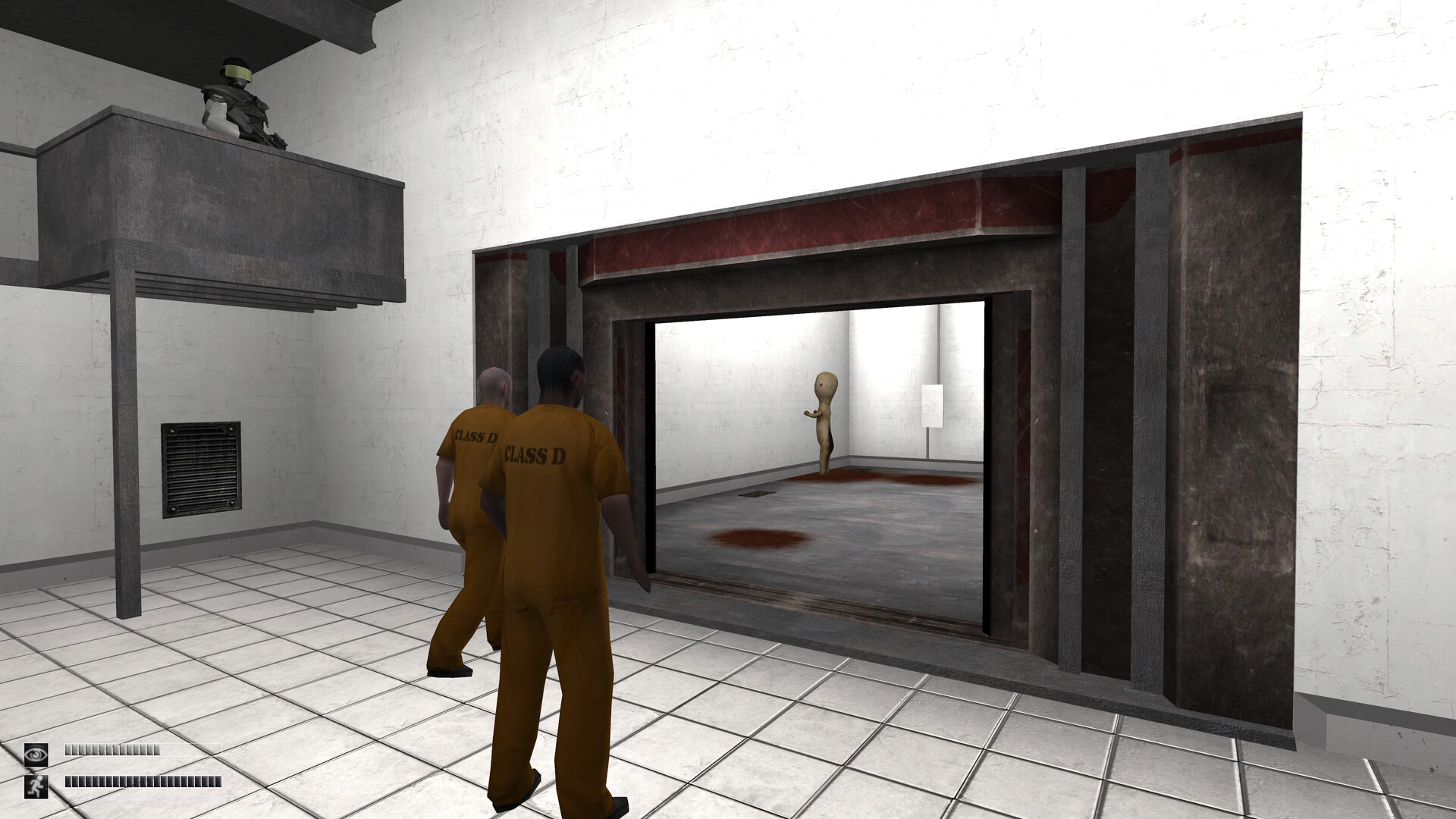
A screenshot from the game’s opening sequence with SCP-173. Rikkonen implemented jump scares to heighten the tension for SCP-173, especially given the nature of its mechanics.

The game was created by Finnish developer Joonas "Regalis" Rikkonen. Before developing SCP – Containment Breach, Rikkonen worked on a simpler game called SCP-087-B based on the SCP-087 story and 2012 video game. This project gained popularity, inspiring Rikkonen to create a larger-scale game incorporating more SCPs. The game was developed using the Blitz3D engine, which Rikkonen chose due to its simplicity and his familiarity with it.

Rikkonen focused heavily on creating an immersive atmosphere, emphasizing environmental design and sound to enhance the horror experience. He used random map generation and randomized events to keep the gameplay tense and unpredictable. Rikkonen also implemented jump scares to heighten the tension, especially given the nature of SCP-173's mechanics. The success led Rikkonen to pursue formal education in game development at the University of Turku after completing upper secondary school.

On February 20, 2026, an updated version of the game was released on Steam, created by the SCP-CB Community Preservation Project—a group of enthusiasts dedicated to preserving the legacy of the original game. This version includes community-created fixes, quality of life improvements, and Steam integration. With updated support for DirectX 9, the game runs smoothly on modern systems and supports high-resolution displays. The package also includes the open-source modding tool Containment Breach Room Editor Extended (CBRE-EX). Support for the Steam Workshop has also been added, making it easier to create, share, and install mods.

== Reception ==
The game received generally positive reviews for its atmosphere and mechanics. Critics praised its ability to create tension and fear despite its low-budget graphics. Rock, Paper, Shotgun compared the game to the TV show Warehouse 13 but noted that SCP – Containment Breach offered a much more intense experience, focusing on fear rather than humor.

Edge magazine noted the game's effectiveness at creating fear through its unpredictable nature, calling it "scarier than most recent big-budget horror games." Despite the game's simple graphics, its tension-filled gameplay was widely appreciated. Jay Is Games wrote that while the game was "not perfect and still a little buggy", it nevertheless "has some serious moments of inarticulate, squealing terror." The game was listed as one of the "best free PC games" by PC Gamer, which praised its use of the SCP mythos as a key component of its success. Destructoid listed the game as "The 10 best indie horror games" and compared the game to I Have No Mouth, and I Must Scream.

== Adaptations ==
The game's premise and assets have been adapted into and inspired several other games, such as the multiplayer first-person shooter SCP: Secret Laboratory, a remake of the game made in the Unity game engine SCP: Unity, and the virtual reality remake SCP: Labrat.
