= SCP: Secret Laboratory =

2017 multiplayer horror/FPS video game

- Logo used since 2017
- Developer: Northwood Studios
- Publisher: Northwood Studios
- Directors: Hubert Moszka (CEO), Edrich Frederik Christoffel Kotze (COO)
- Programmer: Hubert Moszka
- Composer: Jacek Rogal
- Engine: Unity
- Platform: Windows
- Release: 29 December 2017
- Genres: Survival horror, first-person shooter
- Mode: Multiplayer

SCP: Secret Laboratory is a free-to-play, multiplayer, asymmetrical, first-person shooter video game, developed and published by Northwood Studios originally released in 2017. Like its inspiration, SCP: Secret Laboratory takes place during a site-wide containment breach at an SCP Foundation-owned facility. The premise tasks players with either escaping the facility alive, or killing all opposing players, depending on which role they spawn as. The game has received mostly positive reviews for its chaotic gameplay and for being an easy to access introduction to the SCP mythos.

== Gameplay ==
At the start of a round, players can spawn as either D-Class Personnel, Scientists, Facility Guards, or SCPs. Mobile Task Force (MTF) units and Chaos Insurgents, the other two roles in the game, can only spawn during designated spawn waves. Spawn waves can be made up of both players that have died in the middle of a round, as well as those which have joined mid-match.

Keycards, firearms, and other items spawn throughout the facility, and can be equipped by human players. Some of these items are SCPs and experimental weapons being contained at the facility, and can only be found in lockers or rooms that require a keycard with sufficient clearance to access.

SCP: Secret Laboratory is set in 'Site-02', a large containment facility. The facility itself is split into four different 'zones', each serving as spawn locations for the game's playable classes. Light Containment and Heavy Containment are both zones dedicated to the containment of various SCPs. The former of which is also where Scientists and D-Class will spawn. Surface is the external part of the facility, and is both where 'civilian' class players can escape from, as well as where spawn waves will occasionally happen. Entrance Zone serves as a buffer-zone between Surface and Heavy Containment, and is where Facility Guards spawn. Much like in SCP – Containment Breach, the ingame map is randomly generated each time.

SCP: Secret Laboratory features voice chat. Human players have access to a proximity-based voice chat, whilst SCPs can communicate with each other globally. In addition, the game features an intercom room in the Entrance Zone, which allows human players to broadcast messages throughout the entire facility.

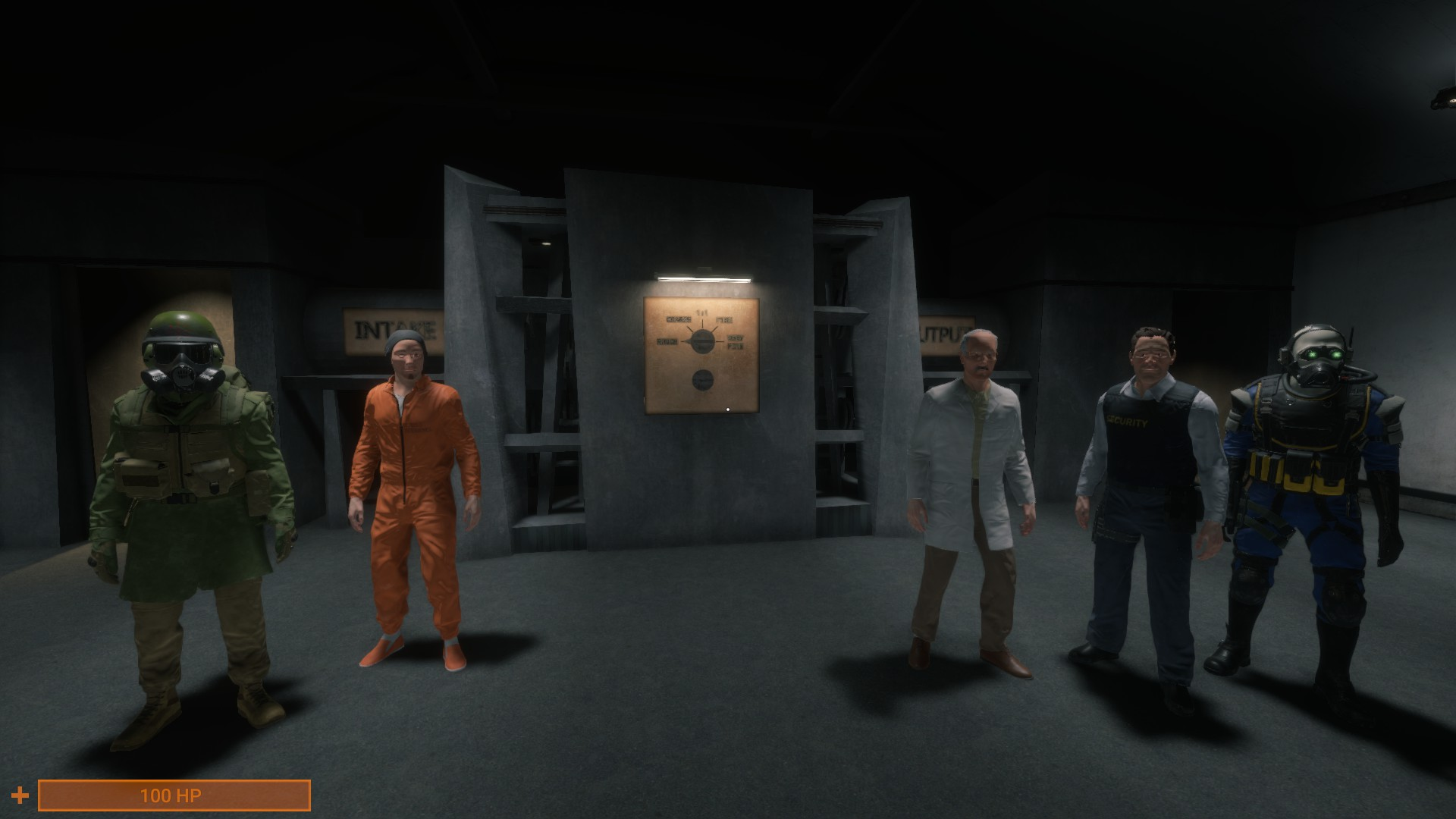
All playable human classes in SCP: Secret Laboratory standing with the containment chamber of SCP-914. From left to right; Chaos Insurgent, Class-D, Scientist, Facility Guard, and Mobile Task Force unit.

=== Humans ===
Human players are split between two different factions; the Foundation (Facility Guards, MTF units, and Scientists), and the Insurgency (Chaos Insurgents and D-Class Personnel).

Scientists and D-Class are 'civilian' classes, and are tasked with escaping the facility without dying. Facility Guards, MTF units, and Chaos Insurgents are 'combative' classes, and must work alongside other members of their faction in order to kill opposing faction members, and help civilians of their own faction escape.

Escaped civilian classes will immediately respawn as either an MTF unit, or Chaos Insurgent, depending on what faction they belong to. If they are detained by a human player on an enemy faction, however, they will join the detainer's faction instead.

=== SCPs ===
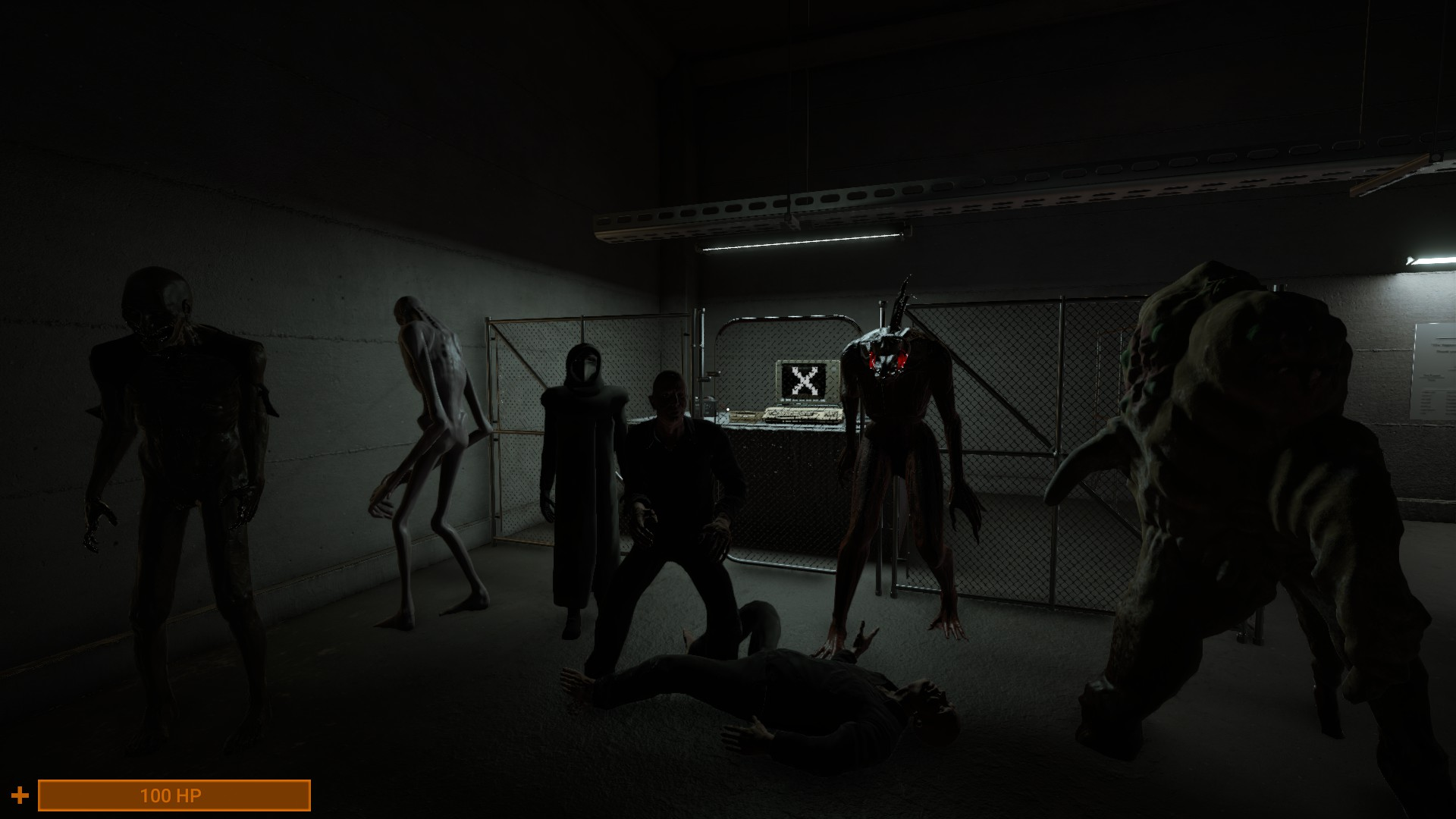
All playable SCPs in SCP Secret Laboratory. From left to right: SCP-106, SCP-096, SCP-049 (and an SCP-049-2 zombie), SCP-079, SCP-939, and SCP-173.

SCPs all work under one unified faction, and must kill all human players as quickly as possible. The SCP faction works differently than human factions do in many ways. Only one of each SCP can spawn in a single round, and each has a plethora of unique abilities only they can use. SCPs are also unable to receive additional spawn waves, or use items. The only way the SCP faction can obtain new members is via the use of SCP-049's resurrection ability; which allows them to turn corpses into SCP-049-2 instances.

Playable SCPs include:

- SCP-049, a humanoid entity resembling a plague doctor. SCP-049 believes that the humans in the facility are inflicted by a 'pestilence', and 'cures' them from it by killing them and turning them into SCP-049-2 instances; which are a type of zombie.
- SCP-079, a malevolent Exidy Sorcerer microcomputer, which has gained access to the facility's systems. 079 observes other players through security cameras, and can meddle with the facility's systems (e.g., closing doors on players or causing blackouts in the room that they are in) in order to help its team kill players.
- SCP-096; a tall, pale humanoid, who can use powerful attacks against human players only if they view its face.
- SCP-106; an elderly humanoid who corrodes anything it touches and can walk through solid objects. If human players are caught by SCP-106, they will be transported to a pocket dimension which slowly decays their health away. They must then choose to go down a random path in the dimension that either kills or releases them.
- SCP-173; a sentient concrete statue that can only move when unobserved. Human players have a universal blink time, which allows SCP-173 to catch up to them and snap their necks.
- SCP-939; a blind, predatory creature with the ability to mimic the voices of other players and play sound effects to deceive human players.

A seventh playable SCP, SCP-953, a misanthropic kumiho with shapeshifting abilities, will be released in the game's 15.0 update.

== Development ==
The game was originally released in 2017, with four playable SCPs, and assets mostly sourced directly from SCP – Containment Breach, or Unity asset packs. Subsequent updates have primarily focused on reworking existing content, as well as replacing Containment Breach assets with original ones.

SCP: Secret Laboratory has also seen user-developed content made for it; not only allowing for custom servers to be hosted, but also allows these servers to run user-made plugins. Users have also created manual mapping tools in order to help them find their way around the randomly generated maps.

== Reception ==
Elie Gould, writing for PC Gamer, in 2025, states that "It's confusing, funny as all hell, and one of the best co-op shooters I've ever played.", and notes that its playable anomalies, gameplay loop, and chaotic player base "form an utterly unhinged experience."

Dean Clark, writing for GameTyrant, in 2018, praised the gameplay and sound design, though they criticized the difficulty of creating and joining servers; calling it "a lot of fun IF you can get it to work". They also criticized the intercom feature, due to its frequent abuse by players; though stated it was an issue with community trolling, rather than with the game itself.

Jonah Schuhart, writing for Screen Rant in 2020, states that the game is a good introduction to the SCP universe, writing that "Even if someone had no exposure to the SCP series, SCP: Secret Laboratory might be a good way to get introduced to the series", and specifically points out that its free-to-play nature and low file size means there's "no harm in trying it out."
