= Sugar transporter SWEET1 =

Protein found in humans

SLC50A1

Identifiers
- Aliases: SLC50A1, HsSWEET1, RAG1AP1, SCP, SWEET1, slv, solute carrier family 50 member 1
- External IDs: OMIM: 613683; MGI: 107417; GeneCards: SLC50A1

Gene location (Human)
Chr.	Chromosome 1 (human)
Band	1q22	Start	155,135,344 bp
Band	1q22	End	155,138,857 bp

Gene location (Mouse)
Chr.	Chromosome 3 (mouse)
Band	3 F1|3 39.04 cM	Start	89,175,553 bp
Band	3 F1|3 39.04 cM	End	89,177,877 bp
RNA expression pattern
Bgee	Human / Mouse (ortholog); Top expressed in: mucosa of transverse colon; rectum; body of pancreas; right adrenal gland; islet of Langerhans; right adrenal cortex; left adrenal gland; right lobe of liver; beta cell; left adrenal cortex / Top expressed in: ankle joint; primary visual cortex; superior frontal gyrus; Ileal epithelium; lip; islet of Langerhans; carotid body; epithelium of stomach; right kidney; parotid gland; More reference expression data
BioGPS	n/a
Gene ontology
Molecular function	glucoside transmembrane transporter activity; sugar transmembrane transporter activity
Cellular component	nucleus; Golgi membrane; membrane; integral component of membrane; Golgi apparatus; endomembrane system; plasma membrane
Biological process	carbohydrate transport; epigenetic maintenance of chromatin in transcription-competent conformation; glucoside transport; hexose transmembrane transport
Sources:Amigo / QuickGO
Orthologs
Databases	NCBI: entry; OMA: entry
Species	Human	Mouse
Entrez	55974	19729
Ensembl	ENSG00000169241	ENSMUSG00000027953
UniProt	Q9BRV3	Q9CXK4
RefSeq (mRNA)	NM_001122837; NM_001122839; NM_001287586; NM_001287587; NM_001287588 NM_001287589; NM_001287590; NM_001287591; NM_001287592; NM_018845	NM_009057
RefSeq (protein)	NP_001116309; NP_001116311; NP_001274515; NP_001274516; NP_001274517 NP_001274518; NP_001274519; NP_001274520; NP_001274521; NP_061333	NP_033083
Location (UCSC)	Chr 1: 155.14 – 155.14 Mb	Chr 3: 89.18 – 89.18 Mb
PubMed search
- Wikidata
View/Edit Human	View/Edit Mouse

Sugar transporter SWEET1, also known as RAG1-activating protein 1 and stromal cell protein (SCP), is a membrane protein that in humans is encoded by the SLC50A1 gene. SWEET1 is the sole transporter from the SLC50 (SWEET) gene family present in the genomes of most animal species, with the exception of the nematode Caenorhabditis elegans, which has seven.

SWEET1 is a broadly-expressed glucose transporter. As the SWEET family has been identified relatively recently, the full range of its functions in animals is not yet clear. However, the bovine SLC50A1 homologue is associated with lactose concentration in milk, and the CiRGA homologue in the sea squirt Ciona intestinalis is essential for tissue differentiation during embryogenesis, especially the development of the notochord. SWEET genes are common in plant genomes, with around twenty paralogues functioning as both sucrose and hexose transporters, and are also associated with pathogen susceptibility.
