= Pa =

Pa, pa, PA, P.A. or pA may refer to:

== Arts, media and entertainment ==
- Parental Advisory, a warning label placed on audio recordings
- P.A. (group), a southern hip hop band in Atlanta, Georgia, United States
- Penny Arcade, a webcomic
- Planetary Annihilation, a 2014 video game
- "Pa" (song), by Tini
- Live PA

== Businesses and organisations ==
=== Government, military, and politics ===
- Palestinian National Authority, also called Palestinian Authority, interim governing body of the Gaza Strip and part of the West Bank
- Pakistan Army
- Patriotic Alliance, a South African political party
- Patriotic Alternative, a British nationalist group
- People's Association, a Singaporean grassroots statutory board
- Philippine Army
- Patrulla Águila
- Planning Authority (Malta), a government agency of Malta
- Progressive Alliance, a political international of social-democratic, socialist and progressive political parties and organisations
- Prudential Authority, the South African government agency responsible for prudential regulation

=== Airlines ===
- Pan American World Airways, IATA airline designator PA (to 1991)
- Florida Coastal Airlines, IATA airline designator PA (1995–2010)
- Airblue, IATA airline designator PA (from 2003)

=== Other ===
- Pā, a traditional Maori settlement
- Professional association, a type of business organization
- PA Consulting Group
- PA Media, a news agency in the UK and Ireland, formerly the Press Association
- Produttori Associati, an Italian record label
- Peterson Academy, online education platform

== Linguistics ==
- Pa (cuneiform), a cuneiform sign
- Pa (Javanese) (ꦥ), a letter in the Javanese script
- Pa (kana), in syllabic Japanese script
- Punjabi language (ISO 639-1 language code pa)
- Abbreviation for several languages, including:
  - Proto-Afro-Asiatic
  - Proto-Algic
  - Proto-Algonquian
  - Proto-Altaic
  - Proto-Athabaskan
  - Proto-Austronesian

== People ==
- Pa, an affectionate term for father
- Pa (name), a list of people with the given name, nickname or surname
- Pa Drengen Changchop Simpa, a mythical ancestor of the Tibetan people

=== Job titles ===
- Parliamentary assistant (UK politics)
- Personal assistant
- Physician assistant or physician associate
- Political assistant
- Production assistant, a title in the film, media, and publishing industries
- Project architect
- Prosecuting attorney, title of prosecutors in some US state courts and smaller jurisdictions
- Protonotary Apostolic, the highest ranking non-episcopal honorific title for Roman Catholic clergy
- Public Accountant, a professional qualification in the US

== Places ==
=== United States ===
- Pennsylvania, US state (postal abbreviation PA)
- Phillips Academy Andover, a private secondary school in Andover, Massachusetts, often referred to as Phillips Andover or PA
- Portsmouth Abbey School, a private secondary school in Portsmouth, Rhode Island
- Pulaski Academy, a private school in Little Rock, Arkansas

=== Elsewhere ===
- Panama (ISO country code PA)
- Pará, Brazil (ISO 3166-2:BR)
- Pâ, a town in Burkina Faso
- PA postcode area, Scotland
- Prince Albert, Saskatchewan, Canada
- Passau City and Passau District, Bavaria, Germany (Vehicle registration plates)

== Science and technology ==
- .pa, top-level domain for Panama
- ALCO PA, a railroad locomotive
- Parental alienation, in psychology
- Pascal (unit), the SI unit of pressure
- Peano axioms, a set of axioms for the natural numbers
- Peptide amphiphile, a type of self-assembling peptide
- Picoamp (pA), one trillionth of an ampere
- Polyacrylamide, a gel-forming polymer
- Polyamide, a family of synthetic materials used in fabrics
- Predictive analytics, analyzes current and historical facts to make predictions about future or otherwise unknown events
- Protactinium, symbol Pa, a chemical element
- Provider-aggregatable address space, a system of allocation of internet addresses
- Public address system (PA system or simply PA), for making public announcements
- Pernicious anemia, anemia that results from lack of intrinsic factor
- Primary aldosteronism, excess production of the hormone aldosterone from the adrenal glands
- RF power amplifier, a type of electronic amplifier

== Sports ==
- Paralympics Australia, previously called the Australian Paralympic Committee (APC) from 1998–2019 is the National Paralympic Committee of Australia
- Pickleball Alberta

== Other uses ==
- PA, a series of paper sizes
- Pā, a type of fortified Māori village
- Performance appraisal, for evaluating an employee's job performance
- Plate appearance, a statistic in baseball
- Prince Albert (genital piercing), a form of male genital piercing
- Public bill, also known as a Public Act, in law
- Papua (vehicle registration prefix PA)

== See also ==
- P&A (disambiguation)
