= IPv6 address =

Label to identify a network interface of a computer or other network node

Decomposition of an IPv6 address into its binary form

An Internet Protocol version 6 address (IPv6 address) is a numeric label that is used to identify and locate a network interface of a computer or a network node participating in a computer network using IPv6. IP addresses are included in the packet header to indicate the source and the destination of each packet. The IP address of the destination is used to make decisions about routing IP packets to other networks.

IPv6 is the successor to the first addressing infrastructure of the Internet, Internet Protocol version 4 (IPv4). In contrast to IPv4, which defined an IP address as a 32-bit value, IPv6 addresses have a size of 128 bits. Therefore, in comparison, IPv6 has a vastly enlarged address space.

== Addressing methods ==
IPv6 addresses are classified by the primary addressing and routing methodologies common in networking: unicast addressing, anycast addressing, and multicast addressing.

A unicast address identifies a single network interface. The Internet Protocol delivers packets sent to a unicast address to that specific interface.

An anycast address is assigned to a group of interfaces, usually belonging to different nodes. A packet sent to an anycast address is delivered to just one of the member interfaces, typically the nearest host, according to the routing protocol's definition of distance. Anycast addresses cannot be identified easily; they have the same format as unicast addresses and differ only by their presence in the network at multiple points. Almost any unicast address can be employed as an anycast address.

A multicast address is also used by multiple hosts that acquire the multicast address destination by participating in the multicast distribution protocol among the network routers. A packet that is sent to a multicast address is delivered to all interfaces that have joined the corresponding multicast group. IPv6 does not implement broadcast addressing. Broadcast's traditional role is subsumed by multicast addressing to the all-nodes link-local multicast group ff02::1. However, the use of the all-nodes group is not recommended, and most IPv6 protocols use protocol-specific link-local multicast groups to avoid disturbing every interface on a given network.

== Address formats ==
An IPv6 address consists of 128 bits. For each of the major addressing and routing methodologies, various address formats are recognized by dividing the 128 address bits into bit groups and using established rules for associating the values of these bit groups with special addressing features.

=== Unicast and anycast address format ===
Unicast and anycast addresses are typically composed of two logical parts: a 64-bit network prefix used for routing, and a 64-bit interface identifier used to identify a host's network interface.

General unicast address format (routing prefix size varies)
| bits | 48 (or more) | 16 (or fewer) | 64 |
| field | routing prefix | subnet ID | interface identifier |

The network prefix (the routing prefix combined with the subnet ID) is contained in the most significant 64 bits of the address. The size of the routing prefix may vary; a larger prefix size means a smaller subnet ID size. The bits of the subnet ID field are available to the network administrator to define subnets within the given network. The 64-bit interface identifier is automatically established randomly, obtained from a DHCPv6 server, or assigned manually. (Historically, it was automatically generated from the interface's MAC address using the modified EUI-64 format, but this method is now not recommended for privacy reasons.)

Unique local addresses are addresses analogous to IPv4 private network addresses.

Unique local address format
| bits | 7 | 1 | 40 | 16 | 64 |
| field | prefix | L | random | subnet ID | interface identifier |

The prefix field contains the binary value 1111110. The L bit is one for locally assigned addresses; the address range with L set to zero is currently not defined. The random field is chosen randomly once, at the inception of the /48 routing prefix.

A link-local address is also based on the interface identifier, but uses a different format for the network prefix.

Link-local address format
| bits | 10 | 54 | 64 |
| field | prefix | zeroes | interface identifier |

The prefix field contains the binary value 1111111010. The 54 zeroes that follow make the total network prefix the same for all link-local addresses (fe80::/64 link-local address prefix), rendering them non-routable.

=== Multicast address format ===
Multicast addresses are formed according to several specific formatting rules, depending on the application.

General multicast address format
| bits | 8 | 4 | 4 | 112 |
| field | prefix | flg | sc | group ID |

For all multicast addresses, the prefix field holds the binary value 11111111.

Currently, three of the four flag bits in the flg field are defined; the most-significant flag bit is reserved for future use.

Multicast address flags
| bit (Note: Bit count starting with 0) | flag | Meaning when 0 | Meaning when 1 |
|---|---|---|---|
| 8 | reserved | reserved | reserved |
| 9 | R (Rendezvous) | Rendezvous point not embedded | Rendezvous point embedded |
| 10 | P (Prefix) | Without prefix information | Address based on network prefix |
| 11 | T (Transient) | Well-known multicast address | Dynamically assigned multicast address |

The four-bit scope field (sc) is used to indicate where the address is valid and unique.

In addition, the scope field is used to identify special multicast addresses, like solicited node.

Solicited-node multicast address format
| bits | 8 | 4 | 4 | 79 | 9 | 24 |
| field | prefix | flg | sc | zeroes | ones | unicast address |

The sc(ope) field holds the binary value 0010 (link-local). Solicited-node multicast addresses are computed as a function of a node's unicast or anycast addresses. A solicited-node multicast address is created by copying the last 24 bits of a unicast or anycast address to the last 24 bits of the multicast address.

Unicast-prefix–based multicast address format
| bits | 8 | 4 | 4 | 4 | 4 | 8 | 64 | 32 |
| field | prefix | flg | sc | res | riid | plen | network prefix | group ID |

Link-scoped multicast addresses use a comparable format.

== Representation ==
An IPv6 address is represented as eight groups of four hexadecimal digits, each group representing 16 bits (Note: A 16 bit or two octet quantity is sometimes also called a hextet.) The groups are separated by colons (:). An example of an IPv6 address is:

2001:0db8:85a3:0000:0000:8a2e:0370:7334

The standards provide flexibility in the representation of IPv6 addresses. The full representation of eight four-digit groups may be simplified by several techniques, eliminating parts of the representation. In general, representations are shortened as much as possible. However, this practice complicates several common operations, namely searching for a specific address or an address pattern in text documents or streams, and comparing addresses to determine equivalence. For mitigation of these complications, the Internet Engineering Task Force (IETF) has defined a canonical format for rendering IPv6 addresses in text:

- The hexadecimal digits are always compared in a case-insensitive manner, but IETF recommendations suggest the use of only lower case letters. For example, 2001:db8::1 is preferred over 2001:DB8::1;
- Leading zeros in each 16-bit field are suppressed, but each group must retain at least one digit. For example, 2001:0db8::0001:0000 is rendered as 2001:db8::1:0;
- The longest sequence of consecutive all-zero fields is replaced with two colons (::). If the address contains multiple runs of all-zero fields of the same size, to prevent ambiguities, it is the leftmost that is compressed. For example, 2001:db8:0:0:1:0:0:1 is rendered as 2001:db8::1:0:0:1 rather than as 2001:db8:0:0:1::1. :: is not used to represent just a single all-zero field. For example, 2001:db8:0:0:0:0:2:1 is shortened to 2001:db8::2:1, but 2001:db8:0000:1:1:1:1:1 is rendered as 2001:db8:0:1:1:1:1:1.

These methods can lead to very short representations for IPv6 addresses. For example, the localhost (loopback) address, 0:0:0:0:0:0:0:1, and the IPv6 unspecified address, 0:0:0:0:0:0:0:0, are reduced to ::1 and ::, respectively.

During the transition of the Internet from IPv4 to IPv6, it is typical to operate in a mixed addressing environment. For such use cases, a special notation has been introduced, which expresses IPv4-mapped and IPv4-compatible IPv6 addresses by writing the least-significant 32 bits of an address in the familiar IPv4 dot-decimal notation, whereas the 96 most-significant bits are written in IPv6 format. For example, the IPv4-mapped IPv6 address ::ffff:c000:0280 is written as ::ffff:192.0.2.128, thus expressing clearly the original IPv4 address that was mapped to IPv6.

=== Networks ===
An IPv6 network uses an address block that is a contiguous group of IPv6 addresses of a size that is a power of two. The leading set of bits of the addresses are identical for all hosts in a given network, and are called the network's address or routing prefix.

Network address ranges are written in CIDR notation. A network is denoted by the first address in the block (ending in all zeroes), a slash (/), and a decimal value equal to the size in bits of the prefix. For example, the network written as 2001:db8:1234::/48 starts at address 2001:db8:1234:0000:0000:0000:0000:0000 and ends at 2001:db8:1234:ffff:ffff:ffff:ffff:ffff.

The routing prefix of an interface address may be directly indicated with the address using CIDR notation. For example, the configuration of an interface with address 2001:db8:a::123 connected to subnet 2001:db8:a::/64 is written as 2001:db8:a::123/64.

=== Address block sizes ===
The size of a block of addresses is specified by writing a slash (/) followed by a number in decimal whose value is the length of the network prefix in bits. For example, an address block with 48 bits in the prefix is indicated by /48. Such a block contains 2^{128 − 48} = 2^{80} addresses. The smaller the length of the network prefix, the larger the block: a /21 block is 8 times larger than a /24 block.

=== Literal IPv6 addresses in network resource identifiers ===
Colon (:) characters in IPv6 addresses may conflict with the established syntax of resource identifiers, such as URIs and URLs. The colon is conventionally used to terminate the host path before a port number. To alleviate this conflict, literal IPv6 addresses are enclosed in square brackets in such resource identifiers, for example:

http://[2001:db8:85a3:8d3:1319:8a2e:370:7348]/

When the URL also contains a port number the notation is:

https://[2001:db8:85a3:8d3:1319:8a2e:370:7348]:443/

where the trailing 443 is the example's port number.

=== Scoped literal IPv6 addresses (with zone index) ===
For addresses with other than global scope (as described in § Address scopes), and in particular for link-local addresses, the choice of the network interface for sending a packet may depend on which zone the address belongs to. The same address may be valid in different zones, and in use by a different host in each of those zones. Even if a single address is not in use in different zones, the address prefixes for addresses in those zones may still be identical, which makes the operating system unable to select an outgoing interface based on the information in the routing table (which is prefix-based).

In order to resolve the ambiguity in textual addresses, a zone index must be appended to the address. The zone index is separated from the address by a percent sign (%). Although numeric zone indices must be universally supported, the zone index may also be an implementation-dependent string. The link-local address

fe80::1ff:fe23:4567:890a

could be expressed by

fe80::1ff:fe23:4567:890a%eth2 (Note: Assuming that eth2 is equivalent to zone number 3. This is usually the case, as real zone numbers start at 1 (0 being the 'default zone'))

or

fe80::1ff:fe23:4567:890a%3

The former (using an interface name) is customary on most Unix-like operating systems (e.g., BSD, Linux, macOS). The latter (using an interface number) is the only syntax on Microsoft Windows, but as support for this syntax is mandatory per standard, it is also available on other operating systems. (Note: Although Windows supports the RFC 3493 if_nametoindex() API for converting a name to an interface number, it does not support the customary "name after %" extension.)

BSD-based operating systems (including macOS) also support an alternative, non-standard syntax, where a numeric zone index is encoded in the second 16-bit word of the address. E.g.:

fe80:3::1ff:fe23:4567:890a

In all operating systems mentioned above, the zone index for link-local addresses actually refers to an interface, not to a zone. As multiple interfaces may belong to the same zone (e.g. when connected to the same network), in practice two addresses with different zone identifiers may actually be equivalent, and refer to the same host on the same link. (Note: The now-removed site-local addresses of fec0::/10 also require a zone index.)

When used in uniform resource identifiers (URI), the use of the percent sign causes a syntax conflict, therefore it must be escaped via percent-encoding, e.g.:

http://[fe80::1ff:fe23:4567:890a%25eth0]/

=== Literal IPv6 addresses in UNC path names ===
In Microsoft Windows operating systems, IPv4 addresses are valid location identifiers in Uniform Naming Convention (UNC) path names. However, the colon is an illegal character in a UNC path name. Thus, the use of IPv6 addresses is also illegal in UNC names. For this reason, Microsoft implemented a transcription algorithm to represent an IPv6 address in the form of a domain name that can be used in UNC paths. For this purpose, Microsoft registered and reserved the second-level domain ipv6-literal.net on the Internet (although they gave up the domain in January 2014). IPv6 addresses are transcribed as a hostname or subdomain name within this namespace, in the following fashion:

2001:db8:85a3:8d3:1319:8a2e:370:7348

is written as

2001-db8-85a3-8d3-1319-8a2e-370-7348.ipv6-literal.net

This notation is automatically resolved locally by Microsoft software, without any queries to DNS name servers.

If the IPv6 address contains a zone index, it is appended to the address portion after an 's' character:

fe80::1ff:fe23:4567:890a%3

is written as

fe80--1ff-fe23-4567-890as3.ipv6-literal.net

== Address scopes ==
Every IPv6 address, except the unspecified address (::), has a scope, which specifies in which part of the network it is valid.

=== Unicast ===
For unicast addresses, two scopes are defined: link-local and global.

Link-local addresses and the loopback address have link-local scope, which means they can only be used on a single directly attached network. All other addresses (including unique local addresses) have global (or universal) scope, which means they are potentially globally routable and can be used to connect to addresses with global scope anywhere, or to addresses with link-local scope on the directly attached network.

Unique local addresses have global scope, but they are not globally administered. As a result, only other hosts in the same administrative domain (e.g., an organization), or within a cooperating administrative domain are able to reach such addresses, if properly routed. As their scope is global, these addresses are valid as a source address when communicating with any other global-scope address, even though it may be impossible to route packets from the destination back to the source.

=== Anycast ===
Anycast addresses are syntactically identical to and indistinguishable from unicast addresses. Their only difference is administrative. Scopes for anycast addresses are therefore the same as for unicast addresses.

=== Multicast ===
For multicast addresses, the four least-significant bits of the second address octet (ff0s::) identify the address scope, i.e. the domain in which the multicast packet should be propagated. Predefined and reserved scopes are:

Scope values
| Value | Scope name | Notes |
|---|---|---|
| 0x0 | reserved | |
| 0x1 | interface-local | Interface-local scope spans only a single interface on a node, and is useful only for loopback transmission of multicast. |
| 0x2 | link-local | Link-local scope spans the same topological region as the corresponding unicast scope. |
| 0x3 | realm-local | Realm-local scope is defined as larger than link-local, automatically determined by network topology and must not be larger than the following scopes. |
| 0x4 | admin-local | Admin-local scope is the smallest scope that must be administratively configured, i.e., not automatically derived from physical connectivity or other, non-multicast-related configuration. |
| 0x5 | site-local | Site-local scope is intended to span a single site belonging to an organisation. |
| 0x8 | organization-local | Organization-local scope is intended to span all sites belonging to a single organization. |
| 0xe | global | Global scope spans all reachable nodes on the Internet – it is unbounded. |
| 0xf | reserved | |

All other scopes are unassigned and available to administrators for defining additional regions.

== Address space ==
=== General allocation ===
The management of IPv6 address allocation process is delegated to the Internet Assigned Numbers Authority (IANA) by the Internet Architecture Board and the Internet Engineering Steering Group. Its main function is the assignment of large address blocks to the regional Internet registries (RIRs), which have the delegated task of allocation to network service providers and other local registries. The IANA has maintained the official list of allocations of the IPv6 address space since December 1995.

In order to allow efficient route aggregation, thereby reducing the size of the Internet routing tables, only one-eighth of the total address space (2000::/3) is currently allocated for use on the Internet. The rest of the IPv6 address space is reserved for future use or for special purposes. The address space is assigned to the RIRs in blocks of /23 up to /12.

The RIRs assign smaller blocks to local Internet registries that distribute them to end users or other organizations. These are typically in sizes from /19 to /32. Global unicast assignment records can be found at the various RIRs or other websites.

The addresses are then typically distributed in /48 sized blocks to small organizations or ISPs, while consumer ISPs typically provide a /56 to subscribers. IPv6 addresses are assigned to organizations in much larger blocks as compared to IPv4 address assignments—the recommended allocation is a /48 block which contains 2^{80} addresses, being 2^{48} or about 2.8×10^{14} times larger than the entire IPv4 address space of 2^{32} addresses and about 7.2×10^{16} times larger than the /8 blocks of IPv4 addresses, which are the largest allocations of IPv4 addresses. The total pool is sufficient for the foreseeable future, because there are 2^{128} (exactly 340,282,366,920,938,463,463,374,607,431,768,211,456; or about 3.4×10^{38}, or 340 undecillion) unique IPv6 addresses.

Each RIR can divide each of its /12 blocks into 1,048,575 /32 blocks, typically one or a few for each ISP; an ISP can divide a /32 block into 65536 /48 blocks, typically one for each customer; customers can then create 65536 /64 networks from their assigned /48 block, each having 2^{64} (exactly 18,446,744,073,709,551,616; or about 1.8×10^{19}) addresses. In contrast, the entire IPv4 address space has only 2^{32} (exactly 4,294,967,296; or about 4.3×10^{9}) addresses.

By design, only a small fraction of the address space will be used actively. The large address space ensures that addresses are almost always available, which makes the use of network address translation (NAT) for the purposes of address conservation unnecessary. NAT has been increasingly used for IPv4 networks to help alleviate IPv4 address exhaustion.

=== Special allocation ===
Provider-independent address space is assigned directly to end user organizations by the RIRs from a special address range (2001:678::/29 for assignees in the RIPE NCC service region) and allows these organizations to make provider changes without renumbering their networks.

Internet exchange points (IXPs) are assigned special addresses mainly from the ranges 2001:7f8::/32 (RIPE NCC), 2001:504::/30 (ARIN), 2001:de0::/27 (APNIC), and 2001:43f8::/32 (AFRINIC) for communication among their connected ISPs.

Root name servers have mostly been assigned addresses from the ranges 2001:500::/30 and 2001:7f8::/29.

=== Reserved anycast addresses ===
The lowest address within each subnet prefix (the interface identifier set to all zeroes) is reserved as the subnet-router anycast address. Applications may use this address when talking to any one of the available routers, as packets sent to this address are delivered to just one router.

The 128 highest addresses within each /64 subnet prefix are reserved to be used as anycast addresses. These addresses usually have the first 57 bits of the interface identifier set to 1, followed by the 7-bit anycast ID. Prefixes for the network can be of any length for routing purposes, but subnets are required to have a length of 64 bits. The address with value 0x7e in the 7 least-significant bits is defined as a mobile IPv6 home agent's anycast address. The address with value 0x7f (all bits 1) is reserved and may not be used. No more assignments from this range have been made, so all the remaining values, 0x00 through 0x7d, are reserved as well.

An exception to this is made for /127 point-to-point links between routers. For such links, the address with the subnet bit zero must not be interpreted as an anycast address, but as a regular unicast address.

== Special addresses ==
There are a number of addresses with special meaning in IPv6. The IANA maintains a registry of these special-purpose addresses. They represent less than 2% of the entire address space:

Special address blocks
| Address block (CIDR) | First address | Last address | Number of addresses | Usage | Purpose |
|---|---|---|---|---|---|
| ::/128 | :: | :: | 1 | Software | Unspecified address |
| ::1/128 | ::1 | ::1 | 1 | Host | Loopback address—a virtual interface that loops all traffic back to itself, the localhost |
| ::ffff:0:0/96 | ::ffff:0.0.0.0 ::ffff:0:0 | ::ffff:255.255.255.255 ::ffff:ffff:ffff | 2^{32} | Software | IPv4-mapped addresses |
| 64:ff9b::/96 | 64:ff9b::0.0.0.0 64:ff9b::0:0 | 64:ff9b::255.255.255.255 64:ff9b::ffff:ffff | 2^{32} | The global Internet | NAT64 IPv4/IPv6 translation |
| 64:ff9b:1::/48 | 64:ff9b:1:: | 64:ff9b:1:ffff:ffff:ffff:ffff:ffff | 2^{80}, with 2^{48} for each IPv4 | Private internets | Local-use IPv4/IPv6 translation |
| 100::/64 | 100:: | 100::ffff:ffff:ffff:ffff | 2^{64} | Routing | Discard prefix |
| 2001::/32 | 2001:: | 2001:0:ffff:ffff:ffff:ffff:ffff:ffff | 2^{96} | The global Internet | Teredo tunneling |
| 2001:20::/28 | 2001:20:: | 2001:2f:ffff:ffff:ffff:ffff:ffff:ffff | 2^{100} | Software | ORCHIDv2 |
| 2001:db8::/32 | 2001:db8:: | 2001:db8:ffff:ffff:ffff:ffff:ffff:ffff | 2^{96} | Documentation | Addresses used in documentation and example source code |
| 2002::/16 | 2002:: | 2002:ffff:ffff:ffff:ffff:ffff:ffff:ffff | 2^{112} | The global Internet | The 6to4 addressing scheme |
| 3fff::/20 | 3fff:: | 3fff:fff:ffff:ffff:ffff:ffff:ffff:ffff | 2^{108} | Documentation | Addresses used in documentation and example source code |
| 5f00::/16 | 5f00:: | 5f00:ffff:ffff:ffff:ffff:ffff:ffff:ffff | 2^{112} | Routing | IPv6 Segment Routing (SRv6) |
| fc00::/7 | fc00:: | fdff:ffff:ffff:ffff:ffff:ffff:ffff:ffff | 2^{121} | Private internets | Unique local address Note L bit equal to 0 is reserved, so currently the first address is fd00::, for 2^{120} addresses. |
| fe80::/64 from fe80::/10 | fe80:: | fe80::ffff:ffff:ffff:ffff | 2^{64} | Link | Link-local address |
| ff00::/8 | ff00:: | ffff:ffff:ffff:ffff:ffff:ffff:ffff:ffff | 2^{120} | The global Internet | Multicast address |

In the past ::ffff:0:0.0.0.0/96 (::ffff:0:0:0/96) was considered for IPv4/IPv6 translation, but it is no longer reserved.

=== Unicast addresses ===
==== Unspecified address ====
- ::/128 – The address with all zero bits is called the unspecified address (corresponding to 0.0.0.0/32 in IPv4). This address must never be assigned to an interface and is to be used only in software before the application has learned its host's source address appropriate for a pending connection. Routers must not forward packets with the unspecified address.

Applications may listen on one or more specific interfaces for incoming connections, which are shown in listings of active internet connections by a specific IP address (and a port number, separated by a colon). When the unspecified address is shown, it means that an application is listening for incoming connections on all available interfaces.

In routing table configuration, the unspecified address may be used to represent the default route address (corresponding to 0.0.0.0/0 in IPv4) for destination addresses (unicast, multicast and others) not specified elsewhere in a routing table.

==== Local addresses ====
- ::1/128 – The loopback address is a unicast localhost address. This address corresponds to 127.0.0.1/8 in IPv4.
  If an application in a host sends packets to this address, the IPv6 stack loops these packets back on the same virtual interface.
- fe80::/10 – Addresses in the link-local prefix are only valid and unique on the local subnet. This address range is comparable to the auto-configuration addresses 169.254.0.0/16 of IPv4.
  Within this prefix, only one /64 subnet is allocated (there are 54 zero bits), yielding an effective format of fe80::/64. The least significant 64 bits were previously chosen as the interface hardware address constructed in modified EUI-64 format, but are now pseudo-random values for privacy. A link-local address is required on every IPv6-enabled interface and applications may rely on the existence of a link-local address even when there is no IPv6 routing.

==== Unique local addresses ====
- fc00::/7 — Unique local addresses (ULAs) are intended for local communication (comparable to IPv4 private addresses 10.0.0.0/8, 172.16.0.0/12 and 192.168.0.0/16).
  They are routable only within a set of cooperating sites. The block is split into two halves. The lower half of the block (fc00::/8) was intended for globally allocated prefixes, but an allocation method has yet to be defined. The upper half (fd00::/8) is used for probabilistically unique addresses in which the /8 prefix is combined with a 40-bit locally generated pseudorandom number to obtain a /48 private prefix. The procedure for selecting a 40-bit number results in only a negligible chance that two sites that wish to merge or communicate encounter address collisions, but can use the same /48 prefix.

==== Transition from IPv4 ====
- ::ffff:0:0/96 — This prefix is used for IPv6 transition mechanisms and designated as an IPv4-mapped IPv6 address.
  With a few exceptions, this address type allows the transparent use of the transport layer protocols over IPv4 through the IPv6 networking application programming interface. In this dual-stack configuration, server applications only need to open a single listening socket to handle connections from clients using IPv6 or IPv4 protocols. IPv6 clients are handled natively by default, and IPv4 clients appear as IPv6 clients at their IPv4-mapped IPv6 address. Transmission is handled similarly; established sockets may be used to transmit IPv4 or IPv6 datagram, based on the binding to an IPv6 address or an IPv4-mapped address.
- ::ffff:0:0:0/96 — A prefix used for IPv4-translated addresses. These are used by the Stateless IP/ICMP Translation (SIIT) protocol.
- 64:ff9b::/96 — The well-known prefix. Addresses with this prefix are used for automatic IPv4/IPv6 translation.
- 64:ff9b:1::/48 — A prefix for locally translated IPv4/IPv6 addresses. Addresses with this prefix can be used for multiple IPv4/IPv6 translation mechanisms like NAT64 and SIIT. Compared to 64:ff9b::/96, these addresses contain their translated IPv4 address in positions 48-63 and 72–87. This means that for every IPv4 address a /88 IPv6 prefix is assigned to the device. This enables similar use cases as 6to4, where a single public IPv4 address gets translated into a prefix. This way, only one level of NAT is required and the devices do not need to do NAT66 internally if they need additional addresses, e.g. for P2P interfaces or docker containers.
- 2002::/16 — This prefix was used for 6to4 addressing (prefix from the IPv4 network, 192.88.99.0/24, was also used).
  The 6to4 addressing scheme is deprecated.

==== Special-purpose addresses ====
IANA has reserved a so-called Sub-TLA ID address block for special assignments of 2001::/23 (split into the range of 64 network prefixes 2001:0000::/29 through 2001:01f8::/29). The following assignments from this block currently exist:

- 2001::/32 — Used for Teredo tunneling, an IPv6 transition mechanism.
- 2001:1::1/128 — Port Control Protocol Anycast
- 2001:1::2/128 — Traversal Using Relays around NAT Anycast
- 2001:1::3/128 — DNS-SD Service Registration Protocol Anycast
- 2001:2::/48 — Used for benchmarking IPv6. Corresponds with 198.18.0.0/15 used for benchmarking IPv4. Assigned to the Benchmarking Methodology Working Group (BMWG).
- 2001:3::/32 — Automatic Multicast Tunneling, Relay Discovery
- 2001:20::/28 — Overlay Routable Cryptographic Hash Identifiers (ORCHIDv2). These are non-routed IPv6 addresses used for cryptographic hashes.
- 2001:30::/28 — Drone Remote ID Protocol Entity Tags (DETs) Prefix

Furthermore, IANA has reserved the following two IPv6 prefixes for AS112 nameserver operations:

- 2620:4f:8000::/48 — Blackhole servers with the traditional authoritative zones configured
- 2001:4:112::/48 — Blackhole servers for the new blackholing approach involving DNAME records to empty.as112.arpa

==== Documentation ====
- 2001:db8::/32 — This prefix is used in documentation, (Note: 192.0.2.0/24, 198.51.100.0/24, and 203.0.113.0/24 are used for documentation in IPv4.) anywhere an example IPv6 address is given or model networking scenarios are described.
- 3fff::/20 — This documentation prefix was allocated in 2024 to account for modern-day large-scale network modelling, that cannot be covered by a single /32 prefix.

==== Discard ====
- 100::/64 — This prefix is used for discarding traffic.

==== Deprecated and obsolete ====
See § Deprecated and obsolete addresses

=== Multicast addresses ===
The multicast addresses ff0x::, where x is any hexadecimal value, are reserved and managed by the Internet Assigned Numbers Authority (IANA).

Common IPv6 multicast addresses
| Address | Description | Available scopes |
|---|---|---|
| ff0x::1 | All nodes address, identify the group of all IPv6 nodes | Available in scope 1 (interface-local) and 2 (link-local): ff01::1 → All nodes in the interface-local; ff02::1 → All nodes in the link-local |
| ff0x::2 | All routers | Available in scope 1 (interface-local), 2 (link-local) and 5 (site-local): ff01::2 → All routers in the interface-local; ff02::2 → All routers in the link-local; ff05::2 → All routers in the site-local |
| ff02::5 | OSPFIGP | 2 (link-local) |
| ff02::6 | OSPFIGP designated routers | 2 (link-local) |
| ff02::9 | RIP routers | 2 (link-local) |
| ff02::a | EIGRP routers | 2 (link-local) |
| ff02::c | Web Services Dynamic Discovery | 2 (link-local) |
| ff02::d | All PIM routers | 2 (link-local) |
| ff02::1a | All RPL routers | 2 (link-local) |
| ff02::16 | All MLDv2-capable routers | 2 (link-local) |
| ff0x::fb | mDNSv6 | Available in all scopes |
| ff0x::101 | All NTP servers | Available in all scopes |
| ff02::1:1 | Link name | 2 (link-local) |
| ff02::1:2 | All DHCPv6 servers and relay agents | 2 (link-local) |
| ff02::1:3 | Link-local multicast name resolution | 2 (link-local) |
| ff05::1:3 | A relay agent may use this address to reach all DHCPv6 servers in the site. | 5 (site-local) |
| ff02::1:ff00:0/104 | Solicited-node multicast address (see below) | 2 (link-local) |
| ff02::2:ff00:0/104 | Node information queries | 2 (link-local) |

==== Solicited-node multicast address ====
The least significant 24 bits of the solicited-node multicast address group ID are filled with the least significant 24 bits of the interface's unicast or anycast address. These addresses allow link-layer address resolution via Neighbor Discovery Protocol (NDP) on the link without disturbing all nodes on the local network. A host is required to join a solicited-node multicast group for each of its configured unicast or anycast addresses.

== Stateless address autoconfiguration (SLAAC) ==
On system startup, a node automatically creates a link-local address on each IPv6-enabled interface, even if globally routable addresses are manually configured or obtained through configuration protocols afterwards (see below). It does so independently and without any prior configuration by stateless address autoconfiguration (SLAAC), using a component of the Neighbor Discovery Protocol. Link-local addresses are in the prefix fe80::/64.

In IPv4, typical configuration protocols include DHCP or PPP. Newer IPv6 hosts can be configured to use the Neighbor Discovery Protocol to create a globally routable unicast address: the host sends router solicitation requests and an IPv6 router responds with a prefix assignment. Other ways to automatically assign IPv6 addresses involve a DHCPv6 server, either in stateless mode, where the server gives the required network parameters for the hosts to generate their own global addresses, or in stateful mode, where the server assigns the global addresses and other required parameters. These mechanisms make renumbering an existing network for a new connectivity provider with different routing prefixes much simpler compared to IPv4, because changing the prefix announced by a few routers can theoretically renumber an entire network.

=== Interface identifier ===
The lower 64 bits of the fe80::/64 address are populated with a 64-bit interface identifier. It can be derived from these sources:

- As the name "interface identifier" suggests, it can be the network adapter's 48-bit MAC address, which is guaranteed to be unique. A MAC address 00-0C-29-0C-47-D5 is turned into a 64-bit modified EUI-64 by first inserting FF-FE in the middle: 00-0C-29-FF-FE-0C-47-D5, and then inverting the Universal/Local bit, becoming 02-0C-29-FF-FE-0C-47-D5 (or :020c:29ff:fe0c:47d5 in IPv6 address notation).
- However, using the real MAC address of the adapter to derive the interface address is now discouraged in end-user devices because it exposes the MAC address to the wider Internet, making it easier to track the user across networks. As a result, it is now common to instead use a pseudorandom address. Existing options include the temporary address, the stable privacy address, and the cryptographically generated address. This is related to, but not the same mechanism as, MAC spoofing; the pseudo-random interface identifier does not need to match the MAC address, real or spoofed.

==== Temporary addresses ====
The globally unique and static MAC addresses used by stateless address autoconfiguration to create interface identifiers offer an opportunity to track user equipment, especially mobile devices such as laptops and cell phones, across time and IPv6 network prefix changes. To reduce the prospect of a user identity being permanently tied to an IPv6 address portion, a node may create temporary addresses with interface identifiers based on time-varying random bit strings and relatively short lifetimes (hours to days), after which they are replaced with new addresses. This makes them random and unstable. A typical consumer device generates a new temporary address daily and will ignore traffic addressed to an old address after one week. Temporary addresses may be used as source addresses for originating connections, while external hosts use a public address by querying the Domain Name System (DNS).

Network interfaces configured for IPv6 use temporary addresses by default in Windows since XP SP1, macOS since (Mac OS X) 10.7, Android since 4.0, and iOS since version 4.3. Use of temporary addresses by Linux distributions varies.

==== Cryptographically generated addresses ====
As a means to enhance security for Neighbor Discovery Protocol cryptographically generated addresses (CGAs) were introduced in 2005 as part of the Secure Neighbor Discovery (SEND) protocol.

Such an address is generated using two hash functions that take several inputs. The first uses a public key and a random modifier; the latter is incremented repeatedly until a specific number of zero bits in the resulting hash is acquired. (Note: Comparable with the 'proof of work' field in Bitcoin mining.) The second hash function takes the network prefix and the previous hash value. The least significant 64 bits of the second hash result is appended to the 64-bit network prefix to form a 128-bit address.

The hash functions can also be used to verify if a specific IPv6 address satisfies the requirement of being a valid CGA. This way, communication can be set up between trusted addresses exclusively.

==== Stable privacy addresses ====
The use of the modified EUI-64 format has serious implications for security and privacy concerns, because the underlying hardware address (most typically the MAC address which by default includes an organizationally unique identifier (OUI) that identifies the manufacturer of either the whole device or the network adapter) is exposed beyond the local network, permitting the tracking of user activities and correlation of user accounts to other information, and the tailoring of security attacks specific to the device's manufacturer if the OUI refers to the whole device's manufacturer. Modified EUI-64 also reduces the size of the address space for searching for attack targets.

Stable privacy addresses were introduced to remedy these shortcomings. They are stable within a specific network but change when moving to another, to improve privacy. They are chosen deterministically but randomly, in the entire address space of the network.

Generation of a stable privacy address is based on a hash function that uses several stable parameters. It is implementation specific, but it is recommended to include at least the network prefix, the name of the network interface, a duplicate address counter, and a secret key. The resulting hash value is used to construct the final address: Typically, the 64 least significant bits are concatenated to the 64-bit network prefix, to yield a 128-bit address. If the network prefix is smaller than 64 bits, more bits of the hash are used. If the resulting address does not conflict with existing or reserved addresses, it is assigned to the interface. Conflicts are resolved by adjusting the duplicate address counter.

=== Neighbor Discovery Protocol operation ===
==== Solicited-node multicast address ====
Each interface in SLAAC also has a solicited-node multicast address, formed from the network prefix ff02::1:ff00:0/104 and the 24 least significant bits of its unicast or anycast address. This multicast address is used in NDP to detect duplicate addresses and to establish the correspondence between IP addresses and link-layer (MAC) addresses.

==== Duplicate address detection ====
The use of non-hardware-derived addresses presents a possibility of duplicate addresses. The assignment of a unicast IPv6 address to an interface involves an internal test for the uniqueness of that address using Neighbor Solicitation and Neighbor Advertisement (ICMPv6 type 135 and 136) messages. While in the process of establishing uniqueness an address has a tentative state.

The node joins the solicited-node multicast address for the tentative address and sends neighbor solicitations, with the tentative address as the target address and the unspecified address (::/128) as its source address. The node also joins the all-hosts multicast address ff02::1, so it can receive neighbor advertisements.

If a node receives a neighbor solicitation with its own tentative address as the target address, then it knows its address is not unique. The same is true if the node receives a neighbor advertisement with the tentative address as the source of the advertisement. Only after having successfully established that an address is unique may it be assigned and used by an interface.

When an anycast address is assigned to an interface (e.g. a subnet-router anycast address), due to the inherent non-uniqueness of this type of address, duplicate address detection is not performed.

==== Router operation ====
In NDP, the router also advertises what /64-sized prefix it has access to on the broader Internet as well as other network parameters. A node that receives this information joins the prefix with its own interface identifier to obtain its unicast address on the broader Internet. For example, if a router has access to 2001:db8:1:2::/64 and the machine has the interface identifier 02-0C-29-FF-FE-0C-47-D5 (continuing the above example), the machine would self-assign the address 2001:db8:1:2:020c:29ff:fe0c:47d5.

DHCPv6 remains useful for other purposes. For example, it can be used by the ISP's router to hand a /64-sized or shorter prefix to the customer's router, a process called prefix delegation.

==== Address lifetime ====
Each IPv6 address that is bound to an interface has a defined lifetime. Lifetimes are infinite unless configured to a shorter period. There are two lifetimes that govern the state of an address: the preferred lifetime and the valid lifetime. Lifetimes can be configured in routers that provide the values used for autoconfiguration, or specified when manually configuring addresses on interfaces.

When an address is assigned to an interface it gets the status preferred, which it holds during its preferred-lifetime. After that lifetime expires, the status becomes deprecated and no new connections should be made using this address. (Note: In most cases, the lifetime does not expire because new Router Advertisements (RAs) refresh the timers. But if there are no more RAs, eventually the preferred lifetime elapses and the address becomes deprecated.) The address becomes invalid after its valid-lifetime also expires; the address is removed from the interface and may be assigned somewhere else on the Internet.

== Default address selection ==
IPv6-enabled network interfaces usually have more than one IPv6 address, for example, a link-local and a global address. They may also have temporary addresses that change after a certain lifetime has expired. IPv6 introduces the concepts of address scope and selection preference, yielding multiple choices for source and destination addresses in communication with another host.

The preference selection algorithm selects the most appropriate address to use in communications with a particular destination, including the use of IPv4-mapped addresses in dual-stack implementations. It uses a configurable preference table that associates each routing prefix with a precedence level. The default table has the following content:

| Prefix | Precedence | Label | Usage |
|---|---|---|---|
| ::1/128 | 50 | 0 | Localhost |
| ::/0 | 40 | 1 | Default unicast |
| ::ffff:0:0/96 | 35 | 4 | IPv4-mapped IPv6 address |
| 2002::/16 | 30 | 2 | 6to4 |
| 2001::/32 | 5 | 5 | Teredo tunneling |
| fc00::/7 | 3 | 13 | Unique local address |
| ::/96 | 1 | 3 | IPv4-compatible addresses (deprecated) |
| fec0::/10 | 1 | 11 | Site-local address (deprecated) |
| 3ffe::/16 | 1 | 12 | 6bone (returned) |

The default configuration places preference on IPv6 usage, and selects destination addresses within the smallest possible scope, so that link-local communication is preferred over globally routed paths when otherwise equally suitable. The prefix policy table is similar to a routing table, with the (inverse) precedence value serving as the role of a link cost; larger values result in higher precedence. Source addresses are preferred to have the same label value as the destination address. Addresses are matched to prefixes based on the longest-matching most-significant bit sequence. Candidate source addresses are obtained from the operating system and candidate destination addresses may be queried via DNS.

To minimize the time to establish a connection when multiple addresses are available for communication, the Happy Eyeballs algorithm was devised. It queries DNS for IPv6 and IPv4 addresses of the target host, sorts candidate addresses using the default address selection table, and tries to establish connections in parallel. The first established connection aborts current and future attempts to connect to other addresses.

== Domain Name System ==
In the Domain Name System, hostnames are mapped to IPv6 addresses by AAAA resource records, so-called quad-A records. For reverse lookup the IETF reserved the domain ip6.arpa, where the name space is hierarchically divided by the 1-digit hexadecimal representation of nibble units (4 bits) of the IPv6 address.

As in IPv4, each host is represented in the DNS by two DNS records: an address record and a reverse mapping pointer record. For example, a host computer named derrick in zone example.com has the unique local address fdda:5cc1:23:4::1f. Its quad-A address record is

 derrick.example.com.  IN  AAAA  fdda:5cc1:23:4::1f

and its IPv6 pointer record is

 f.1.0.0.0.0.0.0.0.0.0.0.0.0.0.0.4.0.0.0.3.2.0.0.1.c.c.5.a.d.d.f.ip6.arpa.  IN  PTR   derrick.example.com.

This pointer record may be defined in a number of zones, depending on the chain of delegation of authority in the zone d.f.ip6.arpa.

The DNS protocol is independent of its transport layer protocol. Queries and replies may be transmitted over IPv6 or IPv4 transports regardless of the address family of the data requested.

AAAA record fields
| NAME | Domain name |
| TYPE | AAAA (28) |
| CLASS | Internet (1) |
| TTL | Time to live, in seconds |
| RDLENGTH | Length of RDATA field |
| RDATA | 128-bit IPv6 address in network byte order |

== Historical notes ==
=== Deprecated and obsolete addresses ===
- The site-local prefix fec0::/10 specifies that the address is valid only within the site network of an organization. It was part of the original addressing architecture in December 1995, but its use was deprecated in September 2004 because the definition of the term site was ambiguous, which led to confusing routing rules. New networks must not support this special type of address. In October 2005, a new specification replaced this address type with unique local addresses.
- The address block 200::/7 was defined as an OSI NSAP-mapped prefix set in August 1996, but was deprecated in December 2004.
- The 96-bit zero-value prefix ::/96, originally known as IPv4-compatible addresses, was mentioned in 1995 but never fully described. This range of addresses was used to represent IPv4 addresses within an IPv6 transition technology. Such an IPv6 address has its first (most significant) 96 bits set to zero, while its last 32 bits are the represented IPv4 address. In February 2006, the IETF deprecated the use of IPv4-compatible addresses. The only remaining use of this address format is to represent an IPv4 address in a table or database with fixed size members that must also be able to store an IPv6 address.
- Address block 3ffe::/16 was allocated for test purposes for the 6bone network in December 1998. Prior to that, the address block 5f00::/8 was used for this purpose. Both address blocks were returned to the address pool in June 2006.
- Due to operational problems with 6to4 the use of address block 2002::/16 is diminishing, since the 6to4 mechanism is deprecated since May 2015. Although IPv4 address block 192.88.99.0/24 is deprecated, 2002::/16 is not.
- In April 2007, the address block 2001:10::/28 was assigned for Overlay Routable Cryptographic Hash Identifiers (ORCHID). It was intended for experimental use. In September 2014 a second version of ORCHID was specified, and with the introduction of block 2001:20::/28 the original block was returned to IANA.

=== Miscellaneous ===
- For reverse DNS lookup, IPv6 addresses were originally registered in the DNS zone ip6.int, because it was expected that the top-level domain arpa would be retired. In 2000, the Internet Architecture Board (IAB) reverted this intention and decided in 2001 that arpa should retain its original function. Domains in ip6.int were moved to ip6.arpa and zone ip6.int was officially removed on 6 June 2006.
- In March 2011, the IETF refined the recommendations for allocation of address blocks to end sites. Instead of assigning either a /48, /64, or /128 (according to IAB's and IESG's views of 2001), Internet service providers should consider assigning smaller blocks (for example, a /56) to end users. The ARIN, RIPE and APNIC regional registries' policies encourage /56 assignments where appropriate.
- Originally, two proposals existed for translating domain names to IPv6 addresses: one using AAAA records, the other using A6 records. AAAA records, the method that prevailed, are comparable to A records for IPv4, providing a simple mapping from hostname to IPv6 address. The method using A6 records used a hierarchical scheme, in which the mapping of subsequent groups of address bits was specified by additional A6 records, providing the possibility to renumber all hosts in a network by changing a single A6 record. As the perceived benefits of the A6 format were not deemed to outweigh the perceived costs, the method was moved to experimental status in 2002, and finally to historic status in 2012.
- In 2009, many DNS resolvers in home-networking NAT devices and routers were found to handle AAAA records improperly. Some of these simply dropped DNS requests for such records, instead of properly returning the appropriate negative DNS response. Because the request is dropped, the host sending the request has to wait for a timeout causing increased latency when connecting to dual-stack IPv6/IPv4 hosts, as the client software waits for the timeout for the IPv6 connection to fail before trying IPv4. Happy Eyeballs provides a solution to this problem.
