= Radvd =

Server software for computer network configuration

radvd
- Developers: Reuben Hawkins, Robin Johnson
- Initial release: 1996; 30 years ago
- Stable release: 2.21 / May 25, 2026; 2 days ago
- Preview release: 2.20-rc1 / November 17, 2023; 2 years ago
- Written in: C
- Platform: Linux and BSD
- Available in: English
- License: BSD-style vanity
- Website: radvd.litech.org
- Repository: github.com/radvd-project/radvd

The Router Advertisement Daemon (radvd) is an open-source software product that implements link-local advertisements of IPv6 router addresses and IPv6 routing prefixes using the Neighbor Discovery Protocol (NDP) as specified in RFC 2461.

== Daemon ==
The Router Advertisement Daemon is used by system administrators in stateless autoconfiguration (RFC 4862.) methods of network hosts on Internet Protocol version 6 networks.

When IPv6 hosts configure their network interface controllers, they multicast router solicitation (RS) requests onto the network to discover available routers. Radvd answers requests with router advertisement (RA) messages. In addition, radvd periodically multicasts RA packets to the attached link to update network hosts. The router advertisement messages contain the routing prefix used on the link, the link maximum transmission unit (MTU), and the address of the responsible default router.

Radvd also supports the recursive DNS server (RDNSS) and DNS search list (DNSSL) options for NDP published in RFC 6106.

== See also ==
- Dynamic Host Configuration Protocol (DHCP)
- Domain Name System (DNS)
- Neighbor Discovery Protocol
- Netsh on Microsoft Windows covers similar functionality
