= DB8 =

DB8 or db8 can refer to:

- Bimota DB8, a motorcycle manufactured by Bimota.
- DB8, a 1948 racing car and 1949 road car. See DB (car)
- Debate, in text messaging abbreviations

== See also ==
- 2001:db8, a prefix used in documentation and discussion of IPv6 addresses
