= Ma & Pa =

Ma & Pa are English nicknames for "mother" and "father", respectively.

Ma & Pa might also refer to:

- Ma and Pa Kettle, comic film characters and film series in the late 1940s and 1950s
- The Maryland and Pennsylvania Railroad, a defunct US railroad

== See also ==
- Ma (disambiguation)
- Pa (disambiguation)
