= Link-local =

Link-local may refer to:

- Data link layer, the second layer of the OSI model of computer networking
- Link-local address, a computer network address

== See also ==
- Local Link (disambiguation)
