= Local Link =

Local Link may refer to:

- Bus services operated by MTA BaltimoreLink, Maryland, United States
- TFI Local Link, rural bus services in Ireland

== See also ==
- Link-local (disambiguation)
