= P&A =

P&A or P and A may stand for:

- Pensacola and Atlantic Railroad
- Phenol and alcohol procedure, used to surgically treat an ingrown toenail, also called a chemical matrixectomy
- Plugged and abandoned, in well drilling
- Prints and Advertising (P&A), a term from film distribution

== See also ==
- Pa (disambiguation)
