= Routing indicator =

In telecommunications, the term routing indicator (RI) has the following meanings:

1. In a message header, an address, i.e., group of characters, that specifies routing instructions for the transmission of the message to its final destination.

A Routing Indicator is a group of letters assigned to identify a station within a tape relay network to facilitate routing of traffic. It indicates the status of the station and may indicate its geographical area. The following factors are reflected in routing indicator assignment:

- (a) National or international affiliation and service (when required) of the station.
- (b) The geographical area in which the station is located or area from which it is served.
- (c) Network status of the station, i.e., major or minor relay, or tributary stations.

Routing indicators consist of not less than four, and not more than seven letters, including suffixes. The intent of allocated letters and of letter position is as follows:

- First Letter - The letter R or the letter “Q” appears as the first letter and distinguishes strategic/worldwide routing indicators from call signs, address groups and theater routing indicators.
- Second Letter - this letter, in conjunction with the first letter, identifies the nation or international alliance to which allotted.
- Third Letter - This letter position serves the following purposes:
1. Normally identifies the geographical area in which a station is located or from which it is served.
2. Exceptionally, may be used by nations or international alliances irrespective of geographical area for specific alternative purposes, such as when the capacity of assigned second letters is insufficient to meet the requirement, or when more than one geographical area is involved as in the case of a tributary actively connected to two different major relay stations. In conjunction with the second letter “J”, may be reallocated, on a national basis, to a country not listed.
- Fourth Letter - This letter position serves a dual purpose as follows:
1. Indicates major relay stations, as generated by assignment requirements.
2. Identifies the service or other national/international entity, as shown in the delineation table.
- (e) Fifth and Following Letters - These letters and positions, when added to the four letters of a major relay routing indicator, designate the minor relay or tributary stations of that major relay station.
