= Pa (name) =

Pa is a masculine given name, a nickname and a surname. It may refer to:

- Edwin "Pa" Watson (1883–1945), United States Army major general, friend and a senior aide to President Franklin D. Roosevelt
- Pa Dibba (born 1987), Gambian footballer
- Pa Konate (born 1994), Swedish footballer
- Pa Laide (fl. 1980s-2000s), Irish footballer
- Pa Odiase (1934–2013), Nigerian composer who wrote his country's national anthem
- Pa Socheatvong (born 1957), Cambodian politician, former Governor of Phnom Penh
- Sam Pa, pseudonym of a mysterious Chinese businessman
