= Provider-independent address space =

Block of IP addresses assigned to an organization

A provider-independent address space (PI) is a block of IP addresses assigned by a regional Internet registry (RIR) directly to an end-user organization. The user must contract with a local Internet registry (LIR) through an Internet service provider to obtain routing of the address block within the Internet.

Provider-independent addresses offer end-users the opportunity to change service providers without renumbering of their networks and to use multiple access providers in a multi-homed configuration. However, provider-independent blocks may increase the burden on global routers, as the opportunity for efficient route aggregation through Classless Inter-Domain Routing (CIDR) may not exist.

== IPv4 assignments ==
One of the RIRs is RIPE NCC. The RIPE NCC can no longer assign IPv4 Provider Independent (PI) address space as it is now using the last /8 of IPv4 address space that it holds. IPv4 address space from this last /8 is allocated according to section 5.1 of "IPv4 Address Allocation and Assignment Policies for the RIPE NCC Service Region". IPv4 Provider-aggregatable (PA) Address space can only be allocated to RIPE NCC members.

== IPv6 assignments ==
In April 2009 RIPE accepted a policy proposal of January 2006 to assign IPv6 provider-independent IPv6 prefixes. Assignments are taken from the address range 2001:678::/29 and have a minimum size of a /48 prefix.

== See also ==
- Multihoming
