= Dot-decimal notation =

Presentation format for numerical data

Dot-decimal notation is a presentation format for numerical data. It consists of a string of decimal numbers, using the full stop (., also called dot in computing) as a separation character.

A common use of dot-decimal notation is in information technology, where it is a method of writing numbers in octet-grouped base-ten (decimal) numbers. In computer networking, Internet Protocol Version 4 (IPv4) addresses are commonly written using the dotted-quad notation of four decimal integers, ranging from 0 to 255 each.

== IPv4 address ==
An IPv4 address in both dot-decimal notation and binary code

Dot-decimal notation is common in the form of dotted-quad notation to represent IPv4 addresses. Dot-decimal notation is a presentation format for numerical data expressed as a string of decimal numbers, each separated by a full stop and represented without any extra leading zeros. For example, the hexadecimal number 0xFF000001 may be expressed in dot-decimal notation as 255.0.0.1.

An IPv4 address has 32 bits. For purposes of representation, the bits may be divided into four octets written in decimal numbers, ranging from 0 to 255, concatenated as a character string with full stop delimiters between each pair of numbers. This octet-grouped dotted-decimal format may more specifically be called dotted octet format, and an address so noted a dotted-quad address.

For example, the address of the loopback interface, usually assigned the host name localhost, is 127.0.0.1. It consists of the four octets (written in binary notation) 01111111, 00000000, 00000000, and 00000001. The 32-bit number is represented in hexadecimal notation as 0x7F000001.

No formal specification of this textual IP address representation exists. The first mention of this format in RFC documents was in RFC 780 for the Mail Transfer Protocol published May 1981, in which the IP address was supposed to be enclosed in brackets or represented as a 32-bit decimal integer prefixed by a pound sign. A table in RFC 790 (Assigned Numbers) used the dotted decimal format, zero-padding each number to three digits. RFC 1123 (Requirements for Internet Hosts – Application and Support) of October 1989 mentions a requirement for host software to accept "IP address in dotted-decimal [...] form", although it notes "[t]his last requirement is not intended to specify the complete syntactic form for entering a dotted-decimal host number". An IETF draft intended to define textual representation of IP addresses expired without further activity.

A popular implementation of IP networking, originating in 4.2BSD, contains a function inet_aton() for converting IP addresses in character string representation to internal binary storage. In addition to the basic four-decimals format and 32-bit numbers, it also supported intermediate syntax forms of octet.24bits (e.g. 10.1234567; for Class A addresses) and octet.octet.16bits (e.g. 172.16.12345; for Class B addresses). It also allowed the numbers to be written in hexadecimal and octal representations, by prefixing them with 0x and 0, respectively. These features continue to be supported in some software, even though they are considered as non-standard. This means addresses with a component written with a leading zero digit may be interpreted differently in programs that do or do not recognize such formats.

A POSIX-conforming variant of inet_aton, the inet_pton() function, supports only the four-decimal variant of IP addresses.

IP addresses in dot-decimal notation are also presented in CIDR notation, in which the IP address is suffixed with a slash and a number, used to specify the length of the associated routing prefix. For example, 127.0.0.1/8 specifies that the IP address has an eight-bit routing prefix, and therefore the subnet mask 255.0.0.0.

== OIDs ==
Object identifiers use a style of dot-decimal notation to represent an arbitrarily deep hierarchy of objects identified by decimal numbers.

== Version numbers ==
Software releases are often given version numbers in dot-decimal notation, with the left-most number designating the major version and any number of subsequent numbers designating less significant identities such as minor version, revision and build. A version number with a zero for the major part, e.g. 0.10.8, conventionally indicates a development version that has never been released (specifically the ninth sub-minor version of the eleventh minor version of the pre-release development work), reserving 1 for the first proper release.

== Libraries ==
Libraries use notation systems consisting of decimal numbers separated by dots, such as the older Dewey Decimal Classification and the Universal Decimal Classification (UDC), to classify books and other works by subject. The UDC additionally codes works with multiple dot-decimal topics, separated by colons.

== Medicine ==

Toe bones or phalanges of the foot

Distal phalanges of the foot
Middle phalanges of the foot
Proximal phalanges of the foot

Dot-decimal notation is also used to describe illnesses in a language-neutral way. For instance, the AO Foundation/Orthopaedic Trauma Association (AO/OTA) classification generates numeric codes for describing broken toes. The first number 88 denotes a fracture of the phalanges, followed by the number code of toe (with the big toe being 1 and the little toe being 5), the number code of phalanx (counting from 1 to 3 outwards from the foot), and the number code of location on the bone (with 1 being the inner end, 3 the outer, and 2 in between). So, for instance, 88.5.3.2 means a fracture to the little toe's outermost bone, in the center. There are other classifications for other fractures and dislocations.

== See also ==
- IPv6 address § Representation
- ISO 2145
- Decimal section numbering
