= Political assistant =

Political assistant may refer to:

- Political assistant (Hong Kong), an appointee under Hong Kong's Political Appointments System
- Political assistant (Netherlands), a staffer of cabinet members in Dutch politics
