= Provider-aggregatable address space =

IP address block for route aggregation

Provider-aggregatable address space (PA) is a block of IP addresses assigned by a regional Internet registry to an Internet service provider which can be aggregated into a single route advertisement for improved Internet routing efficiency.

Unlike provider-independent address space, the end-user of address blocks within a provider-supplied space cannot reuse the addresses if they change up-stream connectivity providers.
