= Pa (Javanese) =

pa
- ꦥ
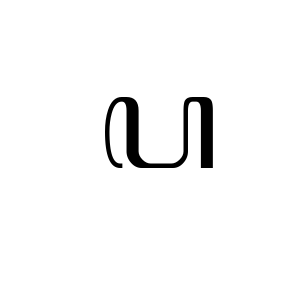
- Aksara nglegena

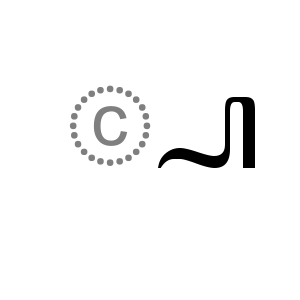
- Aksara pasangan

Usage
- Writing system: Javanese script
- Latin orthography: pa
- Sound values: [p]
- In Unicode: A9A5

ꦥ is one of syllable in Javanese script that represent the sound /pɔ/, /pa/. It is transliterated to Latin as "pa", and sometimes in Indonesian orthography as "po". It has another form (pasangan), which is ◌꧀ꦥ, but represented by a single Unicode code point, U+A9A5.

== Pasangan ==
Its pasangan form ◌꧀ꦥ, is one of six pasangan that's located on the right hand side of the previous syllable. Therefore, it is allowed to write two pasangan at the time without having to resort to use pangkon (꧀).

The location of the sandhangan ꦶ, ꦼ, or ꦁ is on top the pasangan, not on the previous syllable. (See glyph table below)

== Extended form ==
The letter ꦥ has a murda form, which is ꦦ.

Using cecak telu (ꦥ꦳), the syllable represents /f/.

ꦥ with a cerek (ꦉ) is called Pa cerek.

== Glyphs ==
Nglegena forms				Pasangan forms			
ꦥ pa	ꦥꦃ pah	ꦥꦁ pang	ꦥꦂ par	◌꧀ꦥ -pa	◌꧀ꦥꦃ -pah	◌꧀ꦥꦁ -pang	◌꧀ꦥꦂ -par
ꦥꦺ pe	ꦥꦺꦃ peh	ꦥꦺꦁ peng	ꦥꦺꦂ per	◌꧀ꦥꦺ -pe	◌꧀ꦥꦺꦃ -peh	◌꧀ꦥꦺꦁ -peng	◌꧀ꦥꦺꦂ -per
ꦥꦼ pê	ꦥꦼꦃ pêh	ꦥꦼꦁ pêng	ꦥꦼꦂ pêr	◌꧀ꦥꦼ -pê	◌꧀ꦥꦼꦃ -pêh	◌꧀ꦥꦼꦁ -pêng	◌꧀ꦥꦼꦂ -pêr
ꦥꦶ pi	ꦥꦶꦃ pih	ꦥꦶꦁ ping	ꦥꦶꦂ pir	◌꧀ꦥꦶ -pi	◌꧀ꦥꦶꦃ -pih	◌꧀ꦥꦶꦁ -ping	◌꧀ꦥꦶꦂ -pir
ꦥꦺꦴ po	ꦥꦺꦴꦃ poh	ꦥꦺꦴꦁ pong	ꦥꦺꦴꦂ por	◌꧀ꦥꦺꦴ -po	◌꧀ꦥꦺꦴꦃ -poh	◌꧀ꦥꦺꦴꦁ -pong	◌꧀ꦥꦺꦴꦂ -por
ꦥꦸ pu	ꦥꦸꦃ puh	ꦥꦸꦁ pung	ꦥꦸꦂ pur	◌꧀ꦥꦸ -pu	◌꧀ꦥꦸꦃ -puh	◌꧀ꦥꦸꦁ -pung	◌꧀ꦥꦸꦂ -pur
ꦥꦿ pra	ꦥꦿꦃ prah	ꦥꦿꦁ prang	ꦥꦿꦂ prar	◌꧀ꦥꦿ -pra	◌꧀ꦥꦿꦃ -prah	◌꧀ꦥꦿꦁ -prang	◌꧀ꦥꦿꦂ -prar
ꦥꦿꦺ pre	ꦥꦿꦺꦃ preh	ꦥꦿꦺꦁ preng	ꦥꦿꦺꦂ prer	◌꧀ꦥꦿꦺ -pre	◌꧀ꦥꦿꦺꦃ -preh	◌꧀ꦥꦿꦺꦁ -preng	◌꧀ꦥꦿꦺꦂ -prer
ꦥꦽ prê	ꦥꦽꦃ prêh	ꦥꦽꦁ prêng	ꦥꦽꦂ prêr	◌꧀ꦥꦽ -prê	◌꧀ꦥꦽꦃ -prêh	◌꧀ꦥꦽꦁ -prêng	◌꧀ꦥꦽꦂ -prêr
ꦥꦿꦶ pri	ꦥꦿꦶꦃ prih	ꦥꦿꦶꦁ pring	ꦥꦿꦶꦂ prir	◌꧀ꦥꦿꦶ -pri	◌꧀ꦥꦿꦶꦃ -prih	◌꧀ꦥꦿꦶꦁ -pring	◌꧀ꦥꦿꦶꦂ -prir
ꦥꦿꦺꦴ pro	ꦥꦿꦺꦴꦃ proh	ꦥꦿꦺꦴꦁ prong	ꦥꦿꦺꦴꦂ pror	◌꧀ꦥꦿꦺꦴ -pro	◌꧀ꦥꦿꦺꦴꦃ -proh	◌꧀ꦥꦿꦺꦴꦁ -prong	◌꧀ꦥꦿꦺꦴꦂ -pror
ꦥꦿꦸ pru	ꦥꦿꦸꦃ pruh	ꦥꦿꦸꦁ prung	ꦥꦿꦸꦂ prur	◌꧀ꦥꦿꦸ -pru	◌꧀ꦥꦿꦸꦃ -pruh	◌꧀ꦥꦿꦸꦁ -prung	◌꧀ꦥꦿꦸꦂ -prur
ꦥꦾ pya	ꦥꦾꦃ pyah	ꦥꦾꦁ pyang	ꦥꦾꦂ pyar	◌꧀ꦥꦾ -pya	◌꧀ꦥꦾꦃ -pyah	◌꧀ꦥꦾꦁ -pyang	◌꧀ꦥꦾꦂ -pyar
ꦥꦾꦺ pye	ꦥꦾꦺꦃ pyeh	ꦥꦾꦺꦁ pyeng	ꦥꦾꦺꦂ pyer	◌꧀ꦥꦾꦺ -pye	◌꧀ꦥꦾꦺꦃ -pyeh	◌꧀ꦥꦾꦺꦁ -pyeng	◌꧀ꦥꦾꦺꦂ -pyer
ꦥꦾꦼ pyê	ꦥꦾꦼꦃ pyêh	ꦥꦾꦼꦁ pyêng	ꦥꦾꦼꦂ pyêr	◌꧀ꦥꦾꦼ -pyê	◌꧀ꦥꦾꦼꦃ -pyêh	◌꧀ꦥꦾꦼꦁ -pyêng	◌꧀ꦥꦾꦼꦂ -pyêr
ꦥꦾꦶ pyi	ꦥꦾꦶꦃ pyih	ꦥꦾꦶꦁ pying	ꦥꦾꦶꦂ pyir	◌꧀ꦥꦾꦶ -pyi	◌꧀ꦥꦾꦶꦃ -pyih	◌꧀ꦥꦾꦶꦁ -pying	◌꧀ꦥꦾꦶꦂ -pyir
ꦥꦾꦺꦴ pyo	ꦥꦾꦺꦴꦃ pyoh	ꦥꦾꦺꦴꦁ pyong	ꦥꦾꦺꦴꦂ pyor	◌꧀ꦥꦾꦺꦴ -pyo	◌꧀ꦥꦾꦺꦴꦃ -pyoh	◌꧀ꦥꦾꦺꦴꦁ -pyong	◌꧀ꦥꦾꦺꦴꦂ -pyor
ꦥꦾꦸ pyu	ꦥꦾꦸꦃ pyuh	ꦥꦾꦸꦁ pyung	ꦥꦾꦸꦂ pyur	◌꧀ꦥꦾꦸ -pyu	◌꧀ꦥꦾꦸꦃ -pyuh	◌꧀ꦥꦾꦸꦁ -pyung	◌꧀ꦥꦾꦸꦂ -pyur

Other forms
Nglegena forms				Pasangan forms			
ꦥ꦳ fa	ꦥ꦳ꦃ fah	ꦥ꦳ꦁ fang	ꦥ꦳ꦂ far	◌꧀ꦥ꦳ -fa	◌꧀ꦥ꦳ꦃ -fah	◌꧀ꦥ꦳ꦁ -fang	◌꧀ꦥ꦳ꦂ -far
ꦥ꦳ꦺ fe	ꦥ꦳ꦺꦃ feh	ꦥ꦳ꦺꦁ feng	ꦥ꦳ꦺꦂ fer	◌꧀ꦥ꦳ꦺ -fe	◌꧀ꦥ꦳ꦺꦃ -feh	◌꧀ꦥ꦳ꦺꦁ -feng	◌꧀ꦥ꦳ꦺꦂ -fer
ꦥ꦳ꦼ fê	ꦥ꦳ꦼꦃ fêh	ꦥ꦳ꦼꦁ fêng	ꦥ꦳ꦼꦂ fêr	◌꧀ꦥ꦳ꦼ -fê	◌꧀ꦥ꦳ꦼꦃ -fêh	◌꧀ꦥ꦳ꦼꦁ -fêng	◌꧀ꦥ꦳ꦼꦂ -fêr
ꦥ꦳ꦶ fi	ꦥ꦳ꦶꦃ fih	ꦥ꦳ꦶꦁ fing	ꦥ꦳ꦶꦂ fir	◌꧀ꦥ꦳ꦶ -fi	◌꧀ꦥ꦳ꦶꦃ -fih	◌꧀ꦥ꦳ꦶꦁ -fing	◌꧀ꦥ꦳ꦶꦂ -fir
ꦥ꦳ꦺꦴ fo	ꦥ꦳ꦺꦴꦃ foh	ꦥ꦳ꦺꦴꦁ fong	ꦥ꦳ꦺꦴꦂ for	◌꧀ꦥ꦳ꦺꦴ -fo	◌꧀ꦥ꦳ꦺꦴꦃ -foh	◌꧀ꦥ꦳ꦺꦴꦁ -fong	◌꧀ꦥ꦳ꦺꦴꦂ -for
ꦥ꦳ꦸ fu	ꦥ꦳ꦸꦃ fuh	ꦥ꦳ꦸꦁ fung	ꦥ꦳ꦸꦂ fur	◌꧀ꦥ꦳ꦸ -fu	◌꧀ꦥ꦳ꦸꦃ -fuh	◌꧀ꦥ꦳ꦸꦁ -fung	◌꧀ꦥ꦳ꦸꦂ -fur
ꦥ꦳ꦿ fra	ꦥ꦳ꦿꦃ frah	ꦥ꦳ꦿꦁ frang	ꦥ꦳ꦿꦂ frar	◌꧀ꦥ꦳ꦿ -fra	◌꧀ꦥ꦳ꦿꦃ -frah	◌꧀ꦥ꦳ꦿꦁ -frang	◌꧀ꦥ꦳ꦿꦂ -frar
ꦥ꦳ꦿꦺ fre	ꦥ꦳ꦿꦺꦃ freh	ꦥ꦳ꦿꦺꦁ freng	ꦥ꦳ꦿꦺꦂ frer	◌꧀ꦥ꦳ꦿꦺ -fre	◌꧀ꦥ꦳ꦿꦺꦃ -freh	◌꧀ꦥ꦳ꦿꦺꦁ -freng	◌꧀ꦥ꦳ꦿꦺꦂ -frer
ꦥ꦳ꦽ frê	ꦥ꦳ꦽꦃ frêh	ꦥ꦳ꦽꦁ frêng	ꦥ꦳ꦽꦂ frêr	◌꧀ꦥ꦳ꦽ -frê	◌꧀ꦥ꦳ꦽꦃ -frêh	◌꧀ꦥ꦳ꦽꦁ -frêng	◌꧀ꦥ꦳ꦽꦂ -frêr
ꦥ꦳ꦿꦶ fri	ꦥ꦳ꦿꦶꦃ frih	ꦥ꦳ꦿꦶꦁ fring	ꦥ꦳ꦿꦶꦂ frir	◌꧀ꦥ꦳ꦿꦶ -fri	◌꧀ꦥ꦳ꦿꦶꦃ -frih	◌꧀ꦥ꦳ꦿꦶꦁ -fring	◌꧀ꦥ꦳ꦿꦶꦂ -frir
ꦥ꦳ꦿꦺꦴ fro	ꦥ꦳ꦿꦺꦴꦃ froh	ꦥ꦳ꦿꦺꦴꦁ frong	ꦥ꦳ꦿꦺꦴꦂ fror	◌꧀ꦥ꦳ꦿꦺꦴ -fro	◌꧀ꦥ꦳ꦿꦺꦴꦃ -froh	◌꧀ꦥ꦳ꦿꦺꦴꦁ -frong	◌꧀ꦥ꦳ꦿꦺꦴꦂ -fror
ꦥ꦳ꦿꦸ fru	ꦥ꦳ꦿꦸꦃ fruh	ꦥ꦳ꦿꦸꦁ frung	ꦥ꦳ꦿꦸꦂ frur	◌꧀ꦥ꦳ꦿꦸ -fru	◌꧀ꦥ꦳ꦿꦸꦃ -fruh	◌꧀ꦥ꦳ꦿꦸꦁ -frung	◌꧀ꦥ꦳ꦿꦸꦂ -frur
ꦥ꦳ꦾ fya	ꦥ꦳ꦾꦃ fyah	ꦥ꦳ꦾꦁ fyang	ꦥ꦳ꦾꦂ fyar	◌꧀ꦥ꦳ꦾ -fya	◌꧀ꦥ꦳ꦾꦃ -fyah	◌꧀ꦥ꦳ꦾꦁ -fyang	◌꧀ꦥ꦳ꦾꦂ -fyar
ꦥ꦳ꦾꦺ fye	ꦥ꦳ꦾꦺꦃ fyeh	ꦥ꦳ꦾꦺꦁ fyeng	ꦥ꦳ꦾꦺꦂ fyer	◌꧀ꦥ꦳ꦾꦺ -fye	◌꧀ꦥ꦳ꦾꦺꦃ -fyeh	◌꧀ꦥ꦳ꦾꦺꦁ -fyeng	◌꧀ꦥ꦳ꦾꦺꦂ -fyer
ꦥ꦳ꦾꦼ fyê	ꦥ꦳ꦾꦼꦃ fyêh	ꦥ꦳ꦾꦼꦁ fyêng	ꦥ꦳ꦾꦼꦂ fyêr	◌꧀ꦥ꦳ꦾꦼ -fyê	◌꧀ꦥ꦳ꦾꦼꦃ -fyêh	◌꧀ꦥ꦳ꦾꦼꦁ -fyêng	◌꧀ꦥ꦳ꦾꦼꦂ -fyêr
ꦥ꦳ꦾꦶ fyi	ꦥ꦳ꦾꦶꦃ fyih	ꦥ꦳ꦾꦶꦁ fying	ꦥ꦳ꦾꦶꦂ fyir	◌꧀ꦥ꦳ꦾꦶ -fyi	◌꧀ꦥ꦳ꦾꦶꦃ -fyih	◌꧀ꦥ꦳ꦾꦶꦁ -fying	◌꧀ꦥ꦳ꦾꦶꦂ -fyir
ꦥ꦳ꦾꦺꦴ fyo	ꦥ꦳ꦾꦺꦴꦃ fyoh	ꦥ꦳ꦾꦺꦴꦁ fyong	ꦥ꦳ꦾꦺꦴꦂ fyor	◌꧀ꦥ꦳ꦾꦺꦴ -fyo	◌꧀ꦥ꦳ꦾꦺꦴꦃ -fyoh	◌꧀ꦥ꦳ꦾꦺꦴꦁ -fyong	◌꧀ꦥ꦳ꦾꦺꦴꦂ -fyor
ꦥ꦳ꦾꦸ fyu	ꦥ꦳ꦾꦸꦃ fyuh	ꦥ꦳ꦾꦸꦁ fyung	ꦥ꦳ꦾꦸꦂ fyur	◌꧀ꦥ꦳ꦾꦸ -fyu	◌꧀ꦥ꦳ꦾꦸꦃ -fyuh	◌꧀ꦥ꦳ꦾꦸꦁ -fyung	◌꧀ꦥ꦳ꦾꦸꦂ -fyur

== Unicode block ==
Javanese script was added to the Unicode Standard in October, 2009 with the release of version 5.2.

Javanese^{[1]}^{[2]} Official Unicode Consortium code chart (PDF)
	0	1	2	3	4	5	6	7	8	9	A	B	C	D	E	F
U+A98x	ꦀ	ꦁ	ꦂ	ꦃ	ꦄ	ꦅ	ꦆ	ꦇ	ꦈ	ꦉ	ꦊ	ꦋ	ꦌ	ꦍ	ꦎ	ꦏ
U+A99x	ꦐ	ꦑ	ꦒ	ꦓ	ꦔ	ꦕ	ꦖ	ꦗ	ꦘ	ꦙ	ꦚ	ꦛ	ꦜ	ꦝ	ꦞ	ꦟ
U+A9Ax	ꦠ	ꦡ	ꦢ	ꦣ	ꦤ	ꦥ	ꦦ	ꦧ	ꦨ	ꦩ	ꦪ	ꦫ	ꦬ	ꦭ	ꦮ	ꦯ
U+A9Bx	ꦰ	ꦱ	ꦲ	꦳	ꦴ	ꦵ	ꦶ	ꦷ	ꦸ	ꦹ	ꦺ	ꦻ	ꦼ	ꦽ	ꦾ	ꦿ
U+A9Cx	꧀	꧁	꧂	꧃	꧄	꧅	꧆	꧇	꧈	꧉	꧊	꧋	꧌	꧍		ꧏ
U+A9Dx	꧐	꧑	꧒	꧓	꧔	꧕	꧖	꧗	꧘	꧙					꧞	꧟
Notes 1.As of Unicode version 17.0 2.Grey areas indicate non-assigned code points
