= Flap =

Flap may refer to:

== Arts, entertainment, and media ==
- Flap (film), a 1970 American film
- Flap, a boss character in the arcade game Gaiapolis
- Flap, a minor character in the film Little Nemo: Adventures in Slumberland

== Biology and healthcare ==
- Flap (surgery), a surgical technique involving movement of vascularized tissue
  - Free flap, a specific kind of surgical flap
- Flapping tremor is a medical condition, also called asterixis
- 5-lipoxygenase activating protein (FLAP)

== Computing and networks ==
- The phenomenon of some variable or resource oscillating or alternating rapidly between two states
  - Route flapping, when a network router flips between different routes
  - Link flap, errant behavior in a communications link

== Engineering and design ==
- Flap (aeronautics), a lift augmentation device on an airplane wing, often near the trailing edge
- Flapping, the up-and-down motion of a helicopter rotor
- Flap, any hinged plate often used as a cover or a simple one-way valve
  - Sluice or flap gate, a pressure driven water flow control device between a channel and other water body
  - Bum flap (or butt flap), a separately removable part of underwear (un)covering the buttocks
  - Mudflap, a guard for tires
  - Pet door or pet flap
- Roof flap, an aerodynamic feature of race cars

== Linguistics ==
- Flap consonant, a sound produced by brief contact between one articulator (such as the tongue) and another (such as the roof of the mouth)
  - Flapping, a process by which a /t/ or a /d/ before an unstressed vowel is pronounced as a flap consonant

== Other uses ==
- Flapping, one of the basic mechanics of bird flight
- Hand flapping, a common form of self-stimulatory behaviour

== See also ==
- Flapper (disambiguation)
