= Punk fashion =

Fashion of punk subculture

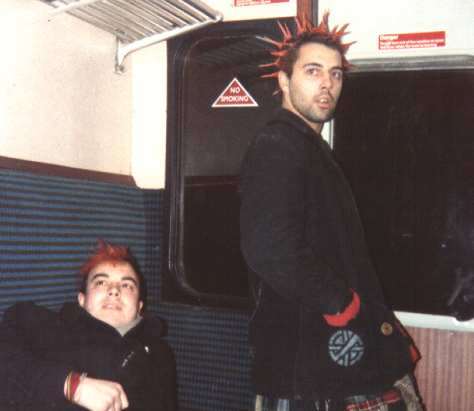
Punk fashion circa 1986, a hairstyle with dyed red liberty spikes

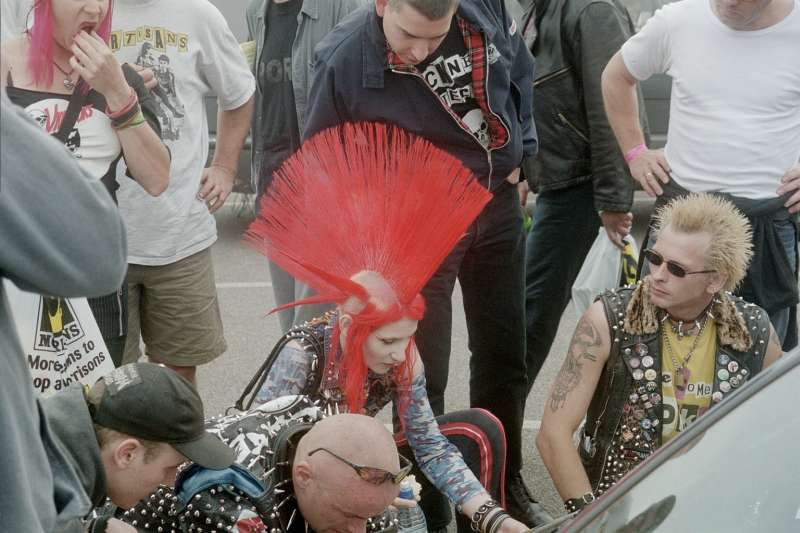
Punks in leather jackets with spikes and pin badges, 2003

Punk fashion is the clothing, hairstyles, cosmetics, jewellery, and body modifications of the punk counterculture. Punk fashion varies widely, ranging from Vivienne Westwood designs to styles modeled on bands like the Exploited to the dressed-down look of North American hardcore. The distinct social dress of other subcultures and art movements, including glam rock, skinheads, greasers, and mods have influenced punk fashion. Punk fashion has likewise influenced the styles of these groups, as well as those of popular culture. Many punks use clothing as a way of making a statement.

The early, pre-fame work of designer Vivienne Westwood helped pioneer the look of early British punk with her scene-establishing clothing shops Sex and Seditionaries in the mid-1970s, co-run with Malcolm McLaren who managed the Sex Pistols. Westwood was asked by then-partner McLaren to outfit the Sex Pistols, and Westwood's designs found a canvas on Johnny Rotten and Sid Vicious. Her early work with Sex and the Sex Pistols helped to establish her as one of the most influential British designers of the 20th century.

Punk fashion has long been commercialized, with fashion designers like Zandra Rhodes, Thierry Mugler, Jean Paul Gaultier, Stephen Sprouse, and Anna Sui using punk elements in their production and the first punk-influenced fashion spreads appearing in mainstream fashion magazines as early as 1976.

== History ==
=== 1970s ===
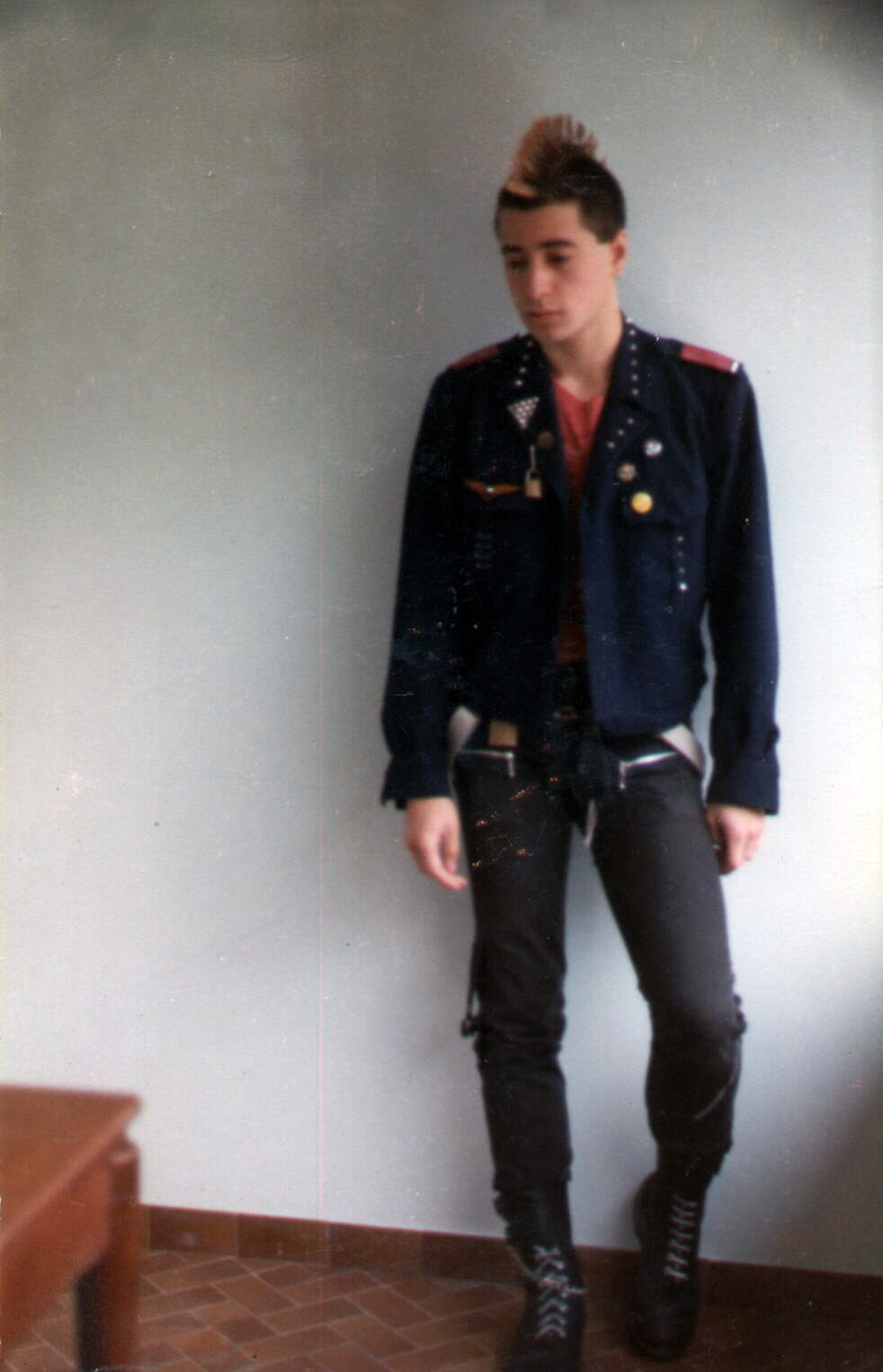
A punk wearing a customized blazer, as was popular in the early punk scene

Punk rock was an intentional rebuttal of the perceived excess and pretension found in mainstream music (or even mainstream culture as a whole), and early punk artists' fashion was defiantly anti-materialistic. Bands that had been at the forefront of the wave of rebellion, like the Rolling Stones and the Beatles, had become 'respectable', having achieved worldwide renown and subsequent wealth. Arena rock groups of the early 1970s, with long, drawn out songs rooted in the psychedelic movement, were viewed as out-of-touch by fans who were much less economically successful. A desire for music to reflect their values of dissatisfaction and alienation began to develop. Generally unkempt, often short hairstyles replaced the long-hair hippie look and the usually elaborate 1970s rock and disco styles. In the United States, dirty, simple clothes – ranging from the T-shirt/jeans/leather jacket Ramones look to the low-class, second-hand "dress" clothes of acts like Television or Patti Smith – were preferred over the expensive or colorful clothing popular in the disco scene.

In the United Kingdom, 1970s punk fashion influenced the designs of Vivienne Westwood and Malcolm McLaren and the Bromley Contingent. Mainstream punk style was influenced by clothes sold in Malcolm McLaren's shop, artdesigncafe. McLaren has credited this style to his first impressions of Richard Hell, while McLaren was in New York City working with New York Dolls. Hell is credited as one of the first to help popularize the stereotypical 'punk' look, spiking his hair and wearing t-shirts that were held together with safety pins. Punk fashion aimed to provoke and challenge middle class culture, often through vulgarity, illicit iconography, and sexual innuendos, among other means. Deliberately offensive T-shirts were popular in the early punk scene, such as the DESTROY T-shirt sold at SEX, which featured an inverted crucifix and a Nazi swastika. Another offensive T-shirt that is still occasionally seen in punk is called Snow White and the Sir Punks, and features Snow White being held down and raped by five of the seven dwarfs, whilst the other two engage in anal sex. The image's origin is as part of The Realist magazine's Disneyland Memorial Orgy poster in May 1967, although the T-shirts made the scene more explicit. These T-shirts, like other punk clothing items, were often torn on purpose. Other items in early British punk fashion included: leather jackets; customised blazers; and dress shirts randomly covered in slogans (such as "Only Anarchists are pretty"), blood, patches and controversial images.

British punks also used fashion as a means to criticize the monarchy; Westwood's God Save the Queen shirt featured an image of Queen Elizabeth II alongside text reading "She ain't no human being", taken directly from the Sex Pistol's single of the same name. While the band has denied that the single was produced specifically in reaction to the Queen's Silver Jubilee, the song and Westwood's design were viewed as an affront to British values of patriotism and the monarchy.

Many early punks wore swastikas and used Nazi imagery in their dress. As a means to provoke people, the symbol retained great power to alarm. Key examples of punk usage of Nazi symbols can be identified in Westwood's DESTROY t-shirt which was worn by members of the Sex Pistols, or a dress shirt which featured striping similar to those on the uniforms worn by prisoners in concentration camps. Sid Vicious wore a t-shirt featuring a swastika while he walked through a Jewish neighbourhood in the film The Great Rock and Roll Swindle. With the resurgence of Britain's National Front, those who wore the swastika discredited the anti-racist values of the movement.

Other accoutrements worn by some punks included: BDSM fashions, fishnet stockings (sometimes ripped), spike bands and other studded or spiked jewelry, safety pins (in clothes and as body piercings), silver bracelets and heavy eyeliner worn by both men and women. Many female punks rebelled against the stereotypical image of a woman by combining clothes that were delicate or pretty with clothes that were considered masculine, such as combining a Ballet tutu with big, clunky boots. Female exemplars of early punk style included Pamela Rooke aka Jordan, Siouxsie Sioux, Soo Catwoman, and Gaye Advert.

Punk clothing sometimes incorporated everyday objects for aesthetic effect. Many outfits were made out pieces of clothing that were readily available, either from secondhand stores or whatever kids had on hand. Emphasizing a DIY ethos, many punks utilized jean and leather jackets as canvases for pins, paint, and spikes. Purposely ripped clothes were held together by safety pins or wrapped with tape; black bin liners (garbage bags) became dresses, shirts and skirts. Mohair, PVC, and other odd, anachronistic elements of fashion were utilized in outfits. Other items added to clothing or as jewellery included razor blades and chains. Leather, rubber and vinyl clothing have been common, possibly due to their connection with transgressive sexual practices, such as bondage and S&M. Provocative imagery referencing sexual practices and deviant forms of sexuality were utilized, such as in Vivienne Westwood's Two Cowboys shirt, which featured an illustration by Jim French of two cowboys naked from the waist down, one of them fixing the other's neckerchief. Its depiction of homosexuality was provocative within a middle-class British culture that was hostile to sexual relations alternate to heterosexuality.

Preferred footwear included military boots, motorcycle boots, brothel creepers, Puma Clydes (suede), Chuck Taylor All-Stars and later, Dr. Martens boots. Tapered jeans, tight leather pants, trousers with leopard patterns and bondage pants were popular choices. Other early punks (most notably the Adicts) imitated the Droogs from A Clockwork Orange by wearing bowler hats and braces. Hair was cropped and deliberately made to look messy, and was often dyed bright unnatural colours. Although provocative, these hairstyles were not as extreme as later punk hairstyle.

Keen designers, much like Westwood, had been able to draw inspiration from the punk style found on the streets, translating its anarchic frustration and resistance to the runways. Zandra Rhodes utilized rips, tears and safety pins in her 1977 'Conceptual Chic' collection; similarly, Claude Montana presented 12 models in "black leather jackets, caps, and pants in 1977. As it gained popularity on the runway, many designers viewed its origin on the streets as 'trashy' and that it no longer served as a source of fresh inspiration. Fashion designers ended up creating a standardized palette where the punk look was, more or less, essentially uniform. Spiky hair, jeans or bondage trousers, leather jackets with slogans, pins, and patches on them, T-shirts, studs and chains all became hallmarks of the look, undermining the individuality that had been essential to the movement.

=== 1980s ===
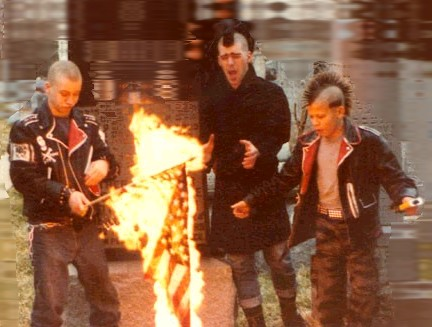
Early 1980s punk fashion

In the 1980s, new fashion styles developed as parallel resurgences occurred in the United States and United Kingdom. What many recognize as typical punk fashions today emerged from the 1980s British scene, when punk underwent its Oi!/street punk and UK82 renaissance. The US scene was exemplified by hardcore bands such as Black Flag, Minor Threat, and Fear. The 1980s American scene spawned a utilitarian anti-fashion that was nonetheless raw, angry, and intimidating. However, elements of the 1970s punk look never fully died away.

Some of the following clothing items were common on both sides of the Atlantic Ocean, and some were unique to certain geographic areas. Footwear that was common in the 1980s punk scene included Dr. Martens boots, motorcycle boots and combat boots; sometimes adorned with bandanas, chains or studded leather bands. Jeans (sometimes dirty, torn or splattered with bleach) and tartan kilts or skirts were commonly worn. Leather skirts became a popular item for female punks. Heavy chains were sometimes used as belts. Bullet belts, and studded belts (sometimes more than one worn at a time) also became common.

Some punks bought T-shirts or plaid flannel shirts and wrote political slogans, band names or other punk-related phrases on them with marker pens. While this was not without precedent in the 1970s, the depth and detail of these slogans were not fully developed until the 1980s. Silkscreened T-shirts with band logos or other punk-related logos or slogans were also popular. Studded, painted and otherwise customised leather jackets or denim vests became more popular during this era, as the popularity of the earlier customized blazers waned, somewhat.

Hair was either shaved, spiked or in a crew cut or Mohawk hairstyle. Tall mohawks and spiked hair, either bleached or in bright colors, took on a more extreme character than in the 1970s. Charged hair, in which all of one's hair stands on end but is not styled into distinct spikes, also emerged. A hairstyle similar to the Misfits' devilocks was popular. This involved cutting a mohawk but leaving a longer tuft of hair at the front of the head. It is still popular to this day in the horror punk scene. Body piercings and extensive tattoos became very popular during this era, as did spike bands and studded in chokers. Some hardcore punk women reacted to the earlier 1970s movement's coquettish vibe by adopting an androgynous style.

Hardcore punk fans adopted a dressed-down style of T-shirts, jeans, combat boots or sneakers and crewcut-style haircuts. Women in the hardcore scene typically wore army pants, band T-shirts, and hooded sweatshirts.

The style of the 1980s hardcore scene contrasted with the more provocative fashion styles of late 1970s punk rockers (elaborate hairdos, torn clothes, patches, safety pins, studs, spikes, etc.). Circle Jerks frontman Keith Morris described early hardcore fashion as "the...punk scene was basically based on English fashion. But we had nothing to do with that. Black Flag and the Circle Jerks were so far from that. We looked like the kid who worked at the gas station or submarine shop." Henry Rollins echoes Morris' point, stating that for him getting dressed up meant putting on a black shirt and some dark pants; Rollins viewed an interest in fashion as being a distraction.

Jimmy Gestapo from Murphy's Law describes his own transition from dressing in a punk style (spiked hair and a bondage belt) to adopting a hardcore style (shaved head and boots) as being based on needing more functional clothing. A scholarly source states that "hardcore kids do not look like punks", since hardcore scene members wore basic clothing and short haircuts, in contrast to the "embellished leather jackets and pants" worn in the punk scene. In contrast to Morris' and Rollins' views, one scholarly source claims that the standard hardcore punk clothing and styles included torn jeans, leather jackets, spiked armbands and dog collars and mohawk hairstyles and DIY ornamentation of clothes with studs, painted band names, political statements, and patches. Another scholarly source describes the look that was common in the San Francisco hardcore scene as consisting of biker-style leather jackets, chains, studded wristbands, pierced noses and multiple piercings, painted or tattooed statements (e.g. an anarchy symbol) and hairstyles ranging from military-style haircuts dyed black or blonde, mohawks, and shaved heads.

== Different styles ==
Various factions of the punk subculture have different fashion styles, although there is often crossover between the subgroups. The following are descriptions of some of the most common punk styles, categorized alphabetically.

=== Anarcho-punk ===
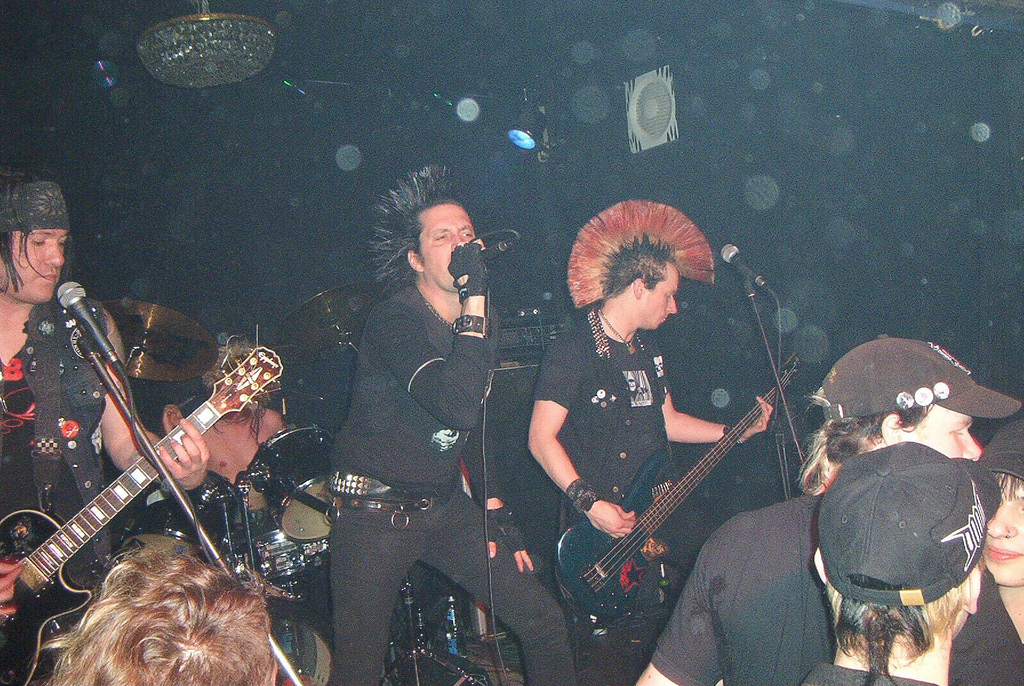
Anarcho-punk band Total Chaos in all-black clothing, 2008

Anarcho-punk fashion usually features all-black militaristic clothing, a style that was pioneered by the English punk band Crass. A prominent feature is the heavy use of anarchist symbols and slogans on clothing items. Some who define themselves as anarcho-punks opt to wear clothing similar to traditional punk fashions or that of crust punks, but not often to the extreme of either subculture. Mohawk hairstyles and liberty spikes are seen. Tight trousers, bands T-shirts and boots are common. Hairstyling products often are used only if the company that manufactures it did not test them on animals. Leather often avoided due to veganism, may be replaced with imitation leather or cloth in a similar design as leather products.

=== Celtic punk ===
Fans of Celtic punk often mix hardcore, street punk, Oi! and skinhead fashions with traditional Irish or Scottish clothing styles, including elements of highland dress. Common items include boots, sneakers, jeans, work trousers, kilts, grandfather shirts, T-shirts, hoodies, braces, black leather jackets, peacoats, donkey jackets, football shirts, flat caps, tuques, Tam O'Shanter caps and Trilby hats. Hair is usually cut relatively short.

=== Cowpunk ===
The cowpunk clothing style is a stereotypical US rural, working class, western wear form of dress. Cowpunks may wear anything from a vintage western wear look, including checked shirts, bib overalls, worn jeans, and cowboy boots, to a more industrial look with wifebeater shirts, trucker hats, and work boots. Women's hair follows no single style, but men can have anything from a crew cut to long hair, or the exaggerated quiff pompadour hairstyle. Facial hair is also common.

=== Crust punk ===
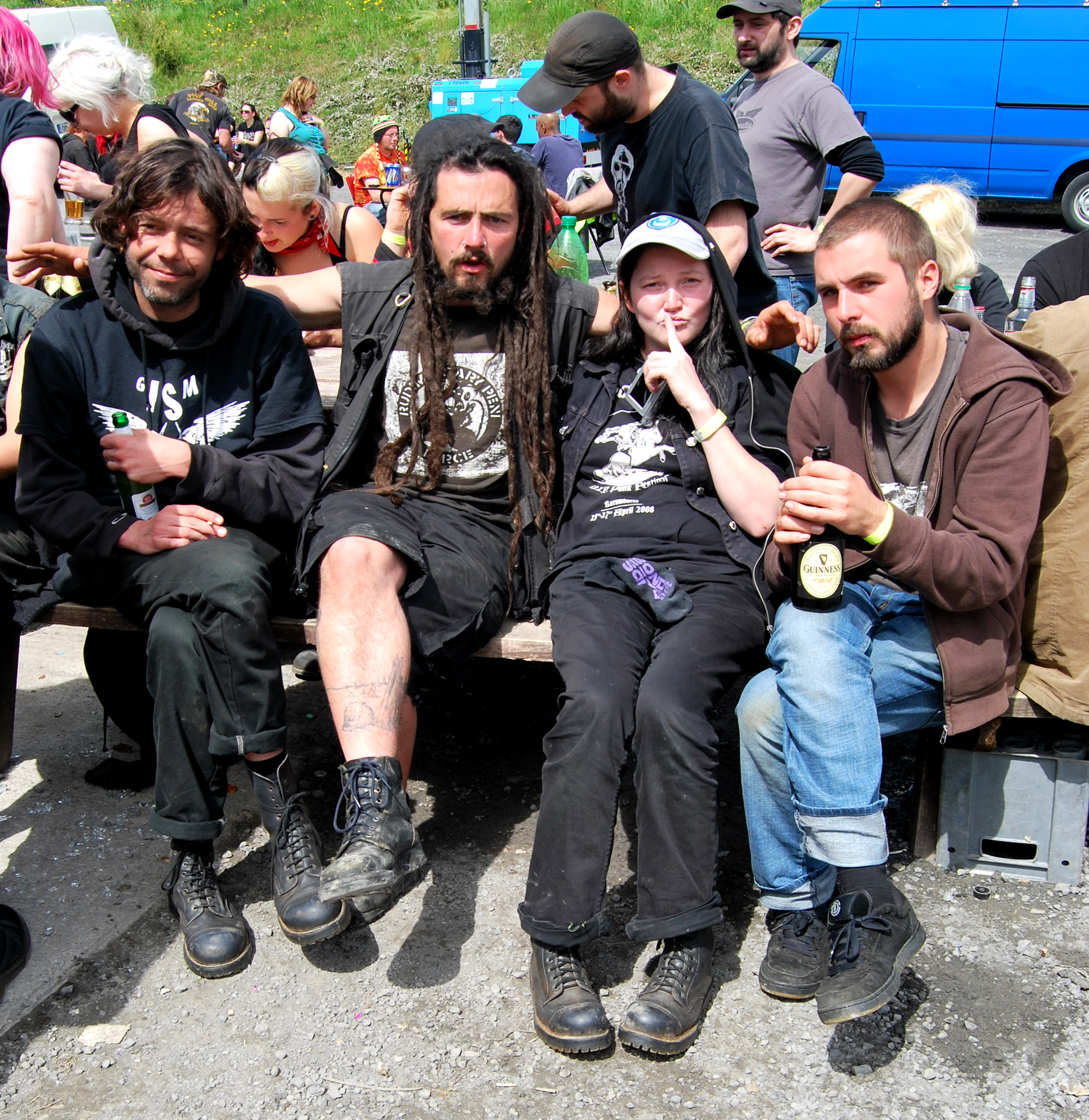
A group of crust punk fans or "crusties"

Crust punk can be traced back to Bristol (UK). In the late 1970s and early 1980s, Bristol bands like Disorder, Chaos UK, Lunatic Fringe, Amebix, broke from the usual punk fashion confines, creating a disheveled DIY look originating in squatting and poverty. Typical crust punk fashion includes black or camouflage trousers or shorts (heavy work pants are popular for their durability), torn band T-shirts or hoodies, skin tight black jeans, vests and jackets (commonly black denim), bullet belts, jewellery made from hemp or found objects, and sometimes bum flaps. Many items of clothing are covered in patches and/or metal studs. Often, the patches display a political message. Clothing tends to be unsanitary by conventional standards, and dreadlocks are popular.

Crust punks sometimes sew articles of clothing with found or cheaply bought materials, such as dental floss. Pants are sometimes held up with string, hemp, or vegan-friendly imitation leather. This fashion has also been used by folk punk fans and musicians, notably Days N Daze, Blackbird Raum, and The Psalters.

=== Dance-punk ===
Dance-punk fashions include day-glo colors, phat pants, glowsticks, leather studded jackets, chains and combat boots. Typical haircuts include spiky hair bleached blond, short mohawks and synthetic dreadlocks.

=== Dark cabaret and Gypsy punk ===
Fans of dark cabaret and Gypsy punk often imitate the costumes of 1920s music hall, sideshow or burlesque performers, pejoratively referred to by some modern critics as "once fashionable trash". Women such as Amanda Palmer of the Dresden Dolls sometimes combine fetish wear such as garter belts, fishnet stockings or corsets with dress clothing, such as a top hat and tailcoat, or traditional Romani dress such as shawls, hoop earrings or colorful skirts. Men often wear vintage Bowler hats, battered fedoras, tweed cloth vests with more typical street punk fashions such as drainpipe trousers or heavy boots. Some artists, including Martyn Jacques of the Tiger Lillies, wear white makeup inspired by French mime artists and the Emcee from Cabaret.

=== Garage punk ===
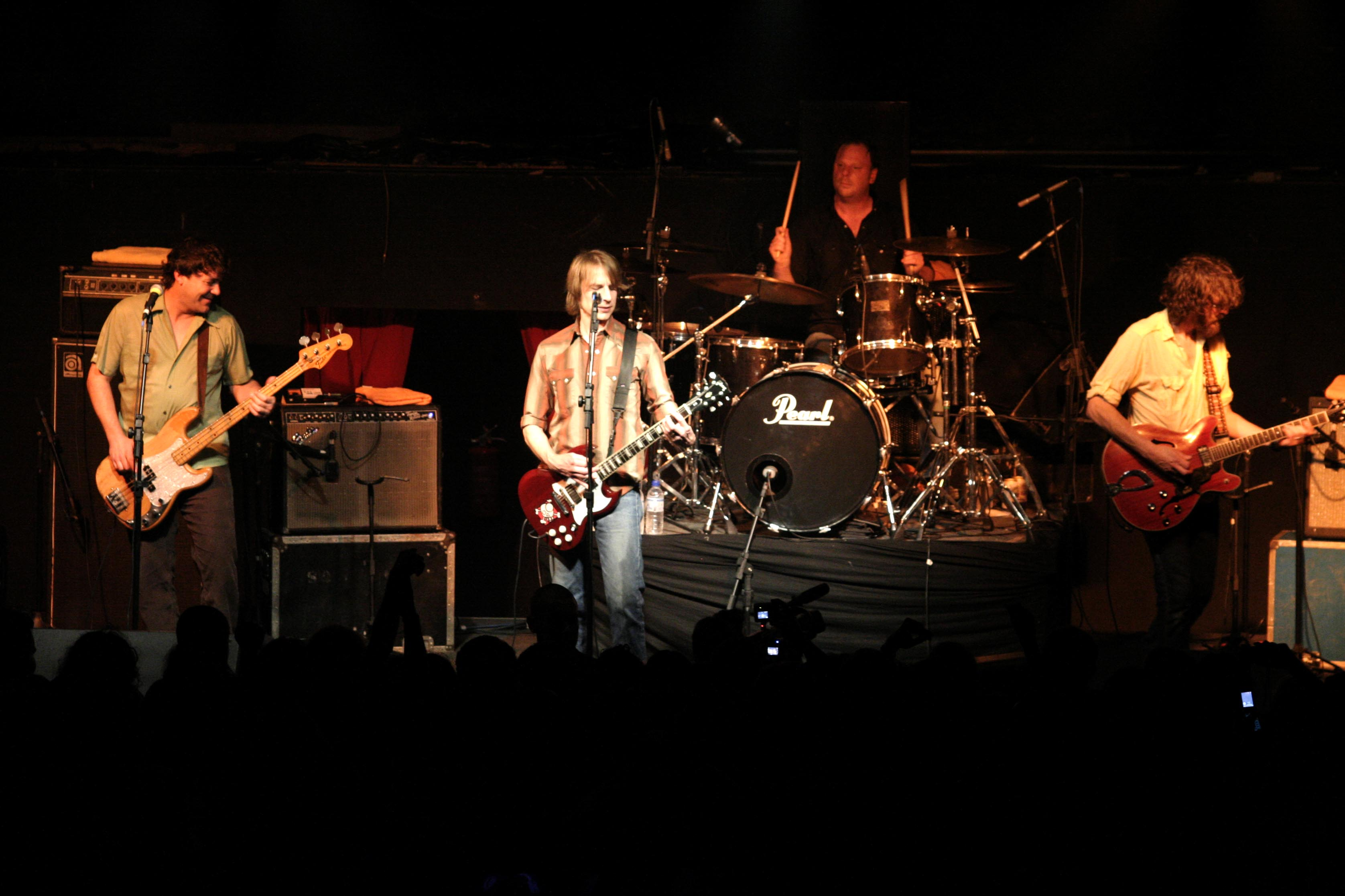
Contemporary garage punk band Mudhoney

Garage punk bands of the 1970s like MC5, Iggy and the Stooges, the Flamin' Groovies and the Ramones often wore secondhand clothing from the mid-late 1960s, such as velvet jackets, slim-fitting grey suits, black leather jackets, winklepickers and drainpipe jeans, in reaction to the flared trousers worn by hippies and disco fans. Their hair was generally worn long, as was then fashionable in the 1970s, but some fans opted for buzzcuts or Caesar cuts, previously associated with hard mods and bootboys. Following the 1980s garage rock revival, garage punk bands tended to dress more casually, with less overtly 1960s clothing. However, the original garage punk look remained a big influence among British indie rock groups during the mid and late-2000s.

=== Glam punk ===
Contemporary to the garage bands of the early 1970s, glam punk fashion, pioneered by bands like the New York Dolls, includes glitter, androgynous make-up, brightly dyed hair, drainpipe jeans, bright colours like electric blue, elements of leather fetish wear, and unusual costumes like leopard print, spandex, or satin shirts. Leftover baroque pop clothing like ruffled pirate shirts or brocade were also worn, together with more typical glam rock fashions like platform boots, tartan, kipper ties, and metallic silver clothing like jumpsuits.

=== Hardcore punk ===
There are several styles of dress within the hardcore scene, and styles have changed since the genre started as hardcore punk in the late 1970s. What is fashionable in one branch of the hardcore scene may be frowned upon in another; however, generally, personal comfort and the ability to mosh during the heavily physical, frenetic, and energetic live hardcore punk shows are highly influential in this style. For this reason, jewellery, spikes, chains and spiky hair are more uncommon and discouraged in hardcore fashion. Ultimately, hardcore punk fashion is usually more understated, working class, and casual compared to some more elaborate punk styles, in part as a response to the physical demands of hardcore punk shows and in part as a working class or more "authentic" backlash response against the perceived increasingly fashion-oriented or pretentious developments within the established punk scene.

Plain working class dress and short hair (with the exception of dreadlocks) are usually associated with hardcore punk. Mute colors and minimal adornment are usually common. Elements of hardcore clothing include baggy jeans or work pants (such as Dickies), khakis or cargo pants, athletic wear, tracksuits, cargo or military shorts, band T-shirts, plain T-shirts, muscle shirts, flannel or plaid shirts, and band hoodies. The leather jackets and denim jackets associated with punk fashion remain common in hardcore punk, though hardcore punk also prominently features bomber jackets and track jackets unlike other punk fashions. Common sneakers include classic Adidas Originals, Asics, Converse, New Balance, Nike, Pony, Puma, Reebok, Saucony and Vans. Boots are also somewhat common, especially Dr. Martens.

Hardcore skinheads, sometimes known as "American punk skinheads", are characterised by some of the same items as British skinhead fashion, but hardcore skinhead dress is considerably less strict than traditional skinhead or oi! skinhead style.

=== Horror punk and deathrock ===
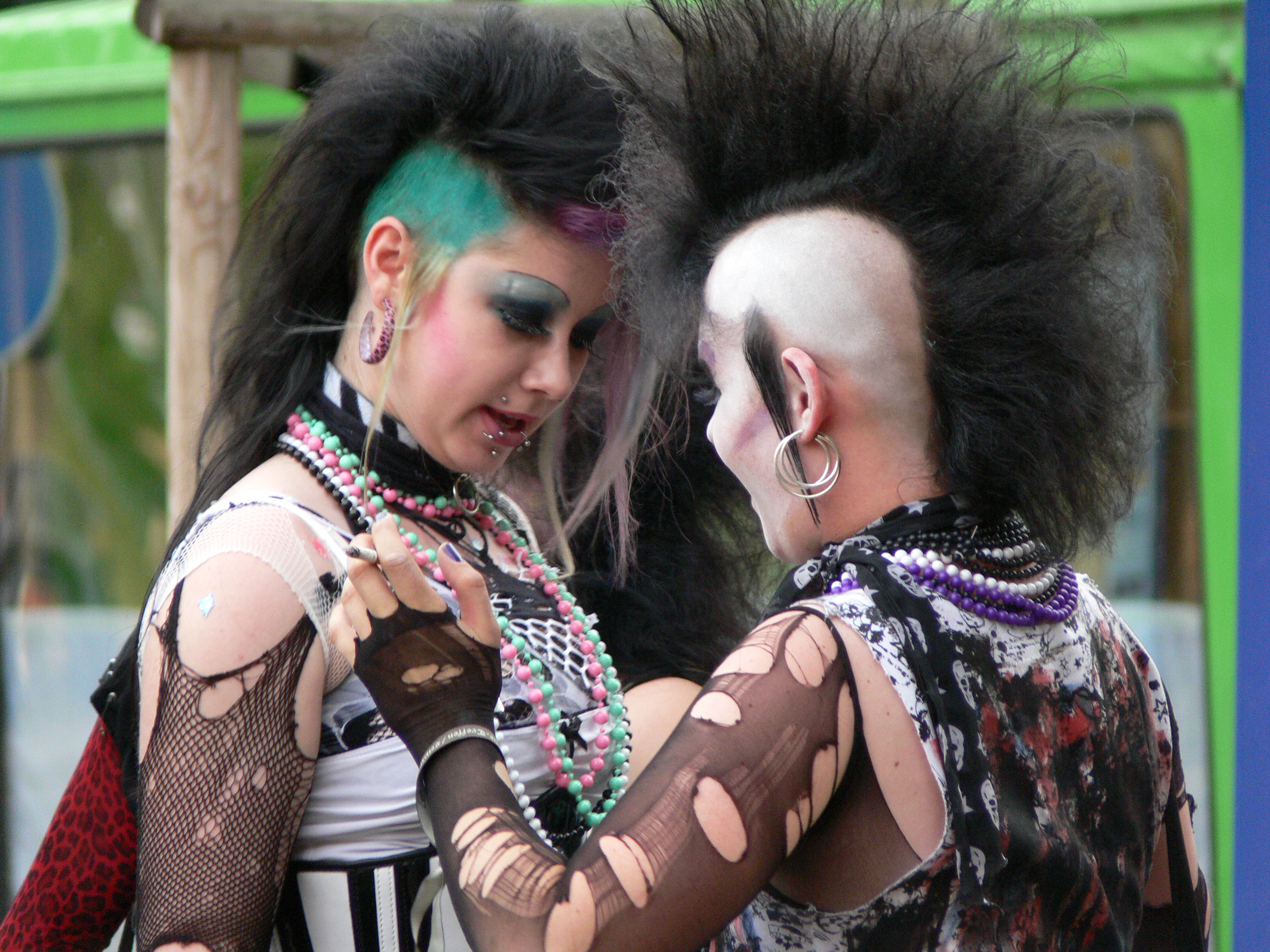
Death-rockers in 2007

Horror punk and deathrock fashions are similar to goth fashion. Black is the predominant shade. Deathrock and horror punk incorporate "sexy" items such as fishnet stockings, corsets and elaborate make-up for men and women. The use of occult and horror imagery is prevalent on T-shirts, buttons, patches and jewellery. Other common adornments include band names painted on jackets or bleached into clothes, as well as buttons or patches indicating cities. The initials D and R (for Death Rock) is sometimes part of a crossbones logo, accompanied by other initials, such as C and A for California, N and Y for New York, or G and R for Germany. Hair may be in a deathhawk style (a wider teased-out variant of the mohawk hairstyle), an angled bangs style, or a devilock style.

=== Pop punk ===
Pop-punk fashion, sometimes overlaps with skater punk fashion. Originally this consisted of black or tartan baggy pants (sometimes fitted with studs and eyelets), band hoodies, wristbands, patrol caps, pyramid stud belts, dress shirts with thin ties or scarves, blazers and spiky hair or fauxhawks. In the mid-2000s, pop-punk fashion, influenced by indie rock, hip-hop and emo fashions, evolved to include cartoon print hoodies, Converse shoes, keffiyehs and skinny jeans. Spiky hair was gradually replaced by skater styles with long fringes or bangs. In the 2010s, pop punk fans took on a more hardcore look, with shorter hair (including Liberty spikes and a wide Mohawk combined with a fringe), plain hoodies and straight-leg jeans.

=== Psychobilly ===
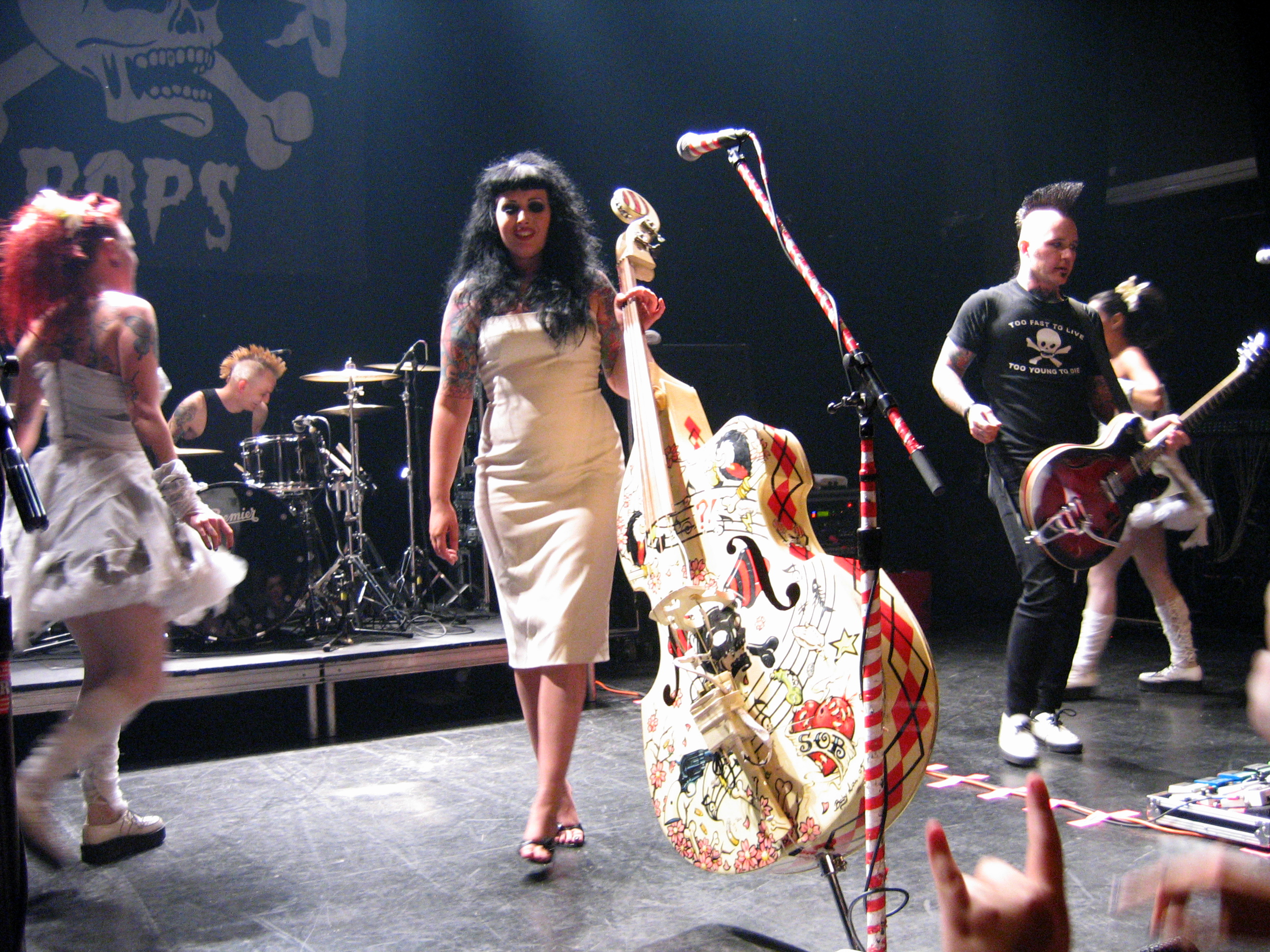
Contemporary psychobilly band the Horrorpops

Psychobilly fashion combines elements of punk with 1950s Greaser and British Teddy Boy fashions. Brothel creepers are frequently worn, as well as leather jackets, gas-station shirts, black or white retro T-shirts, dark-colored drape jackets and vintage motorcycle/work boots. Hair consists of a quiff, pompadour or psychobilly wedge, usually with the sides shaved into a mohawk. Clothing is usually adorned with motifs inspired by classic American horror films or art-styles inspired by Ed "Big Daddy" Roth. This subculture is strongly associated with the Kustom Kulture movement.

=== Ska punk ===
Ska punk fans typically dress in a style that mixes typical ska- or 2 Tone-related fashions, with various types of punk fashions, including street punk, pop-punk, skate punk or hardcore punk. Braces are popular, as are Harrington jackets with royal Stewart tartan lining, thin ties, Doc Martens, mohair suits, pork pie hats, tonik suits (especially in the early years of the 1980s ska revival), tank tops, Ben Sherman or Fred Perry polo shirts, hoodies, and checkerboard patterns. Hair is cropped very short in imitation of hardcore punk bands and early 1960s rude boys. as of 1990s and today many ska fans dressed out normally with regular or simple clothing.

=== Skate punk ===
Skate punk is a derivative of hardcore fashion and is chosen with comfort and practicality in mind. Common skate punk clothing items include T-shirts, flannel button-down shirts, hooded sweatshirts, webbing belts, and khaki shorts, pants or jeans. Some punks, especially in Southern California, mirror Latino gang styles, including khaki Dickies work pants, white T-shirts and colored bandanas. While some skateboarders have long and messy hair, skate punks usually have short hair, often shaved into a buzzcut, and wear little jewelry.

=== Street punk and Oi! ===
In general, contemporary street punks wear leather, denim, metal spikes or studs, chains and military-style boots. They often wear elements of early punk fashion, such as kutten vests, bondage trousers (often plaid) and torn clothing. DIY-created and modified clothing, such as ripped or stitched-together trousers or shirts, or trousers that are tightly tapered, are common. Jackets and vests often have patches or are painted with logos that express musical tastes or political views. Bullet belts and belts with metal studs are popular. Hair is often spiked and/or dyed in bright, unnatural colors and arranged into a mohawk or liberty spikes, but it is sometimes cut very short or shaved.

Oi! skinheads, sometimes known as skunks or punk-skinheads, fuse traditional skinhead style with street punk fashions. The look is characterised by Dr. Martens boots (or similar boots made by a different brand), braces, and tight rolled-up jeans, sometimes splattered with bleach. Other common items are T-shirts (featuring band names, political beliefs or other text and images relevant to skinhead culture) and denim jackets or flight jackets. These jackets are sometimes decorated with buttons or patches, and in the case of the denim jackets, sometimes splattered with bleach. Hair is typically shaved shorter than with traditional skinheads. Other items from traditional skinhead fashion (e.g. Fred Perry and Ben Sherman shirts) and, to a lesser extent, punk fashion items (e.g. short mohawk hairstyles, metal studs on jackets) are also sometimes worn.

==== Droog ====
During the early 1980s, some street punks and Oi! skinheads adopted elements of the dress style from the film A Clockwork Orange. On stage, bands like The Adicts, or more recently The Bolokos and Japan's Hat Trickers, often wear bowler hats, white shirts, white trousers, braces, and black combat boots in imitation of Alex De Large, the protagonist of the film and novel. Some fans also wore fishtail coats, although more often they wore black leather biker jackets or long black Crombie coats.

=== Rivethead ===
A "rivethead" or "rivet head" is a person associated with the industrial dance music scene. In stark contrast to the original industrial culture, whose performers and heterogeneous audience were sometimes referred to as "industrialists", the rivethead scene is a coherent youth culture closely linked to a discernible fashion style. The scene emerged in the late 1980s on the basis of electro-industrial, EBM, and industrial rock music. The associated dress style draws on military fashion and punk aesthetics with hints of fetish wear, mainly inspired by the scene's musical protagonists.

== See also ==
- Alternative fashion
- Fetish fashion
- Heavy metal fashion
- Gothic fashion
- PVC clothing
- Emo fashion
- Scene fashion
