= Hardcore skinhead =

Subculture of heavy metal and hardcore music

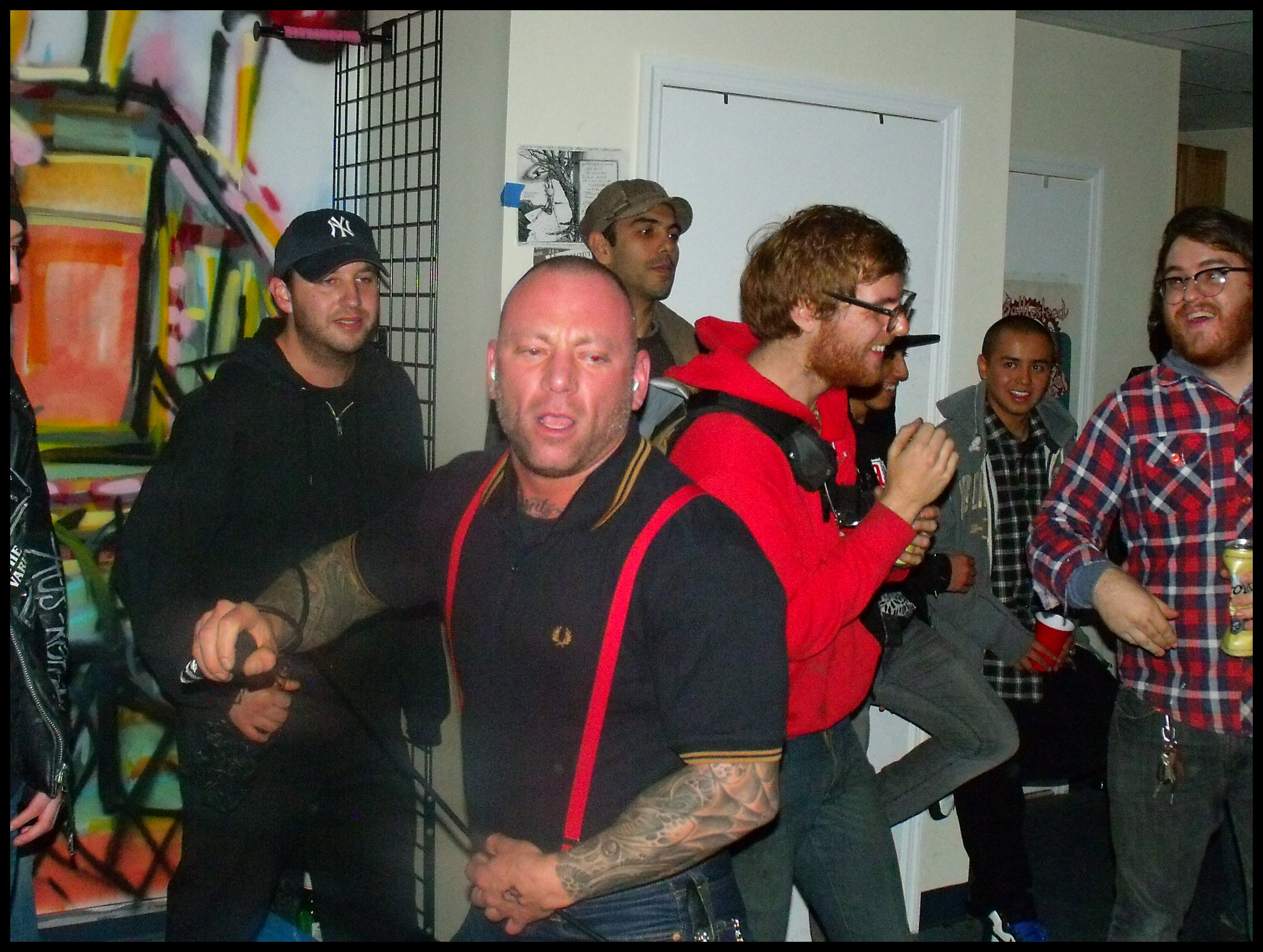
Hardcore band Razors in the Night

Hardcore skinheads are skinheads who mainly associate with Oi!, hardcore and sometimes heavy metal instead of ska and soul or other music genres associated with the skinhead subculture.

Starting in the early 1980s, there were many skinheads in the New York hardcore scene; however, Detroit, Chicago, Seattle and Boston also had strong scenes. Skinheads became prevalent towards the end of the first wave of hardcore, and this continued through the youth crew era of hardcore. Many of the key New York skinhead hardcore bands were influenced by the burgeoning crossover thrash scene. In the early 1990s, there was a steep decline in the involvement of skinheads in the hardcore scene as more of them moved on to the American Oi! scene. However, these American Oi! bands were distinct from their British forerunners because they were influenced by the American hardcore sound. The White Power Skinhead scene also produced several hardcore bands in the late 1980s and 1990s like Blue Eyed Devils, Angry Aryans, No Alibi, Steelcap and H8 Machine. These bands are sometimes referred to as hatecore.

== Style and clothing ==
Although characterised by some of the same items as British skinhead fashion (flight jackets; Ben Sherman shirts or Fred Perry shirts; rolled up jeans; suspenders; and combat boots or Dr. Martens boots), hardcore skinhead dress is considerably less strict than traditional skinhead style. Items that have been popular in the hardcore skinhead subculture include: leather jackets, army jackets, windbreaker jackets, hooded sweatshirts, bandanas, baseball caps, white "wifebeater" shirts, looser jeans (perhaps torn at the knee), heavy chains worn as belts, and construction or rigger's gloves. Trainer sneakers, in particular Adidas Sambas, have been popular.

== Bibliography ==
- Blush, Steven and Petros, George; American Hardcore: A Tribal History; Los Angeles, CA : Feral House : Distributed by Publishers Group West, 2001. OCLC 48658495
