= Tellum =

Hairstyle

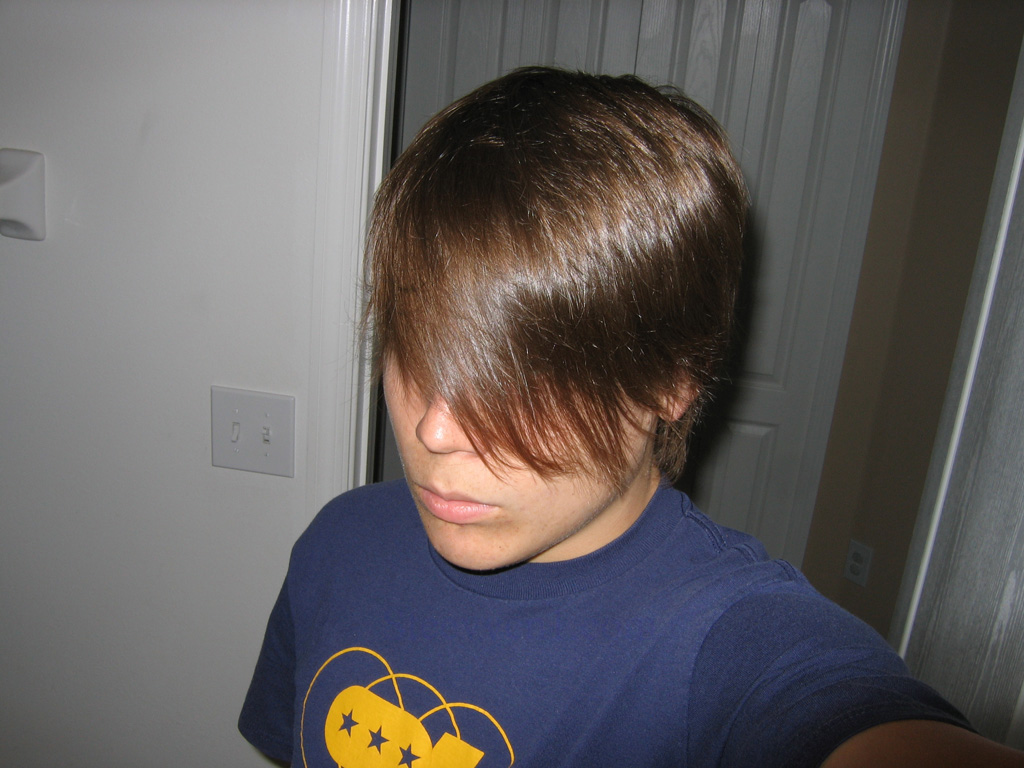
Emo with tellum

The tellum or reverse mullet (also referred to as a frullet) is a hairstyle similar to the mullet. "Tellum" is "mullet" spelled backwards. While a mullet is short in the front and long in the back, the opposite is true for a tellum. The hair is longer in the front (usually straight cheek-chin length hair), and is short/buzzed in the back. The back is often spiky as well. It is not uncommon that the back layers of hair are dyed a different color than the front, or that there are drastically different colored streaks (highlights/lowlights) running through the front of the hair.

== Fashion history ==
In the late 1970s, the first interpretation of the tellum was the devilock, made famous by The Misfits. The Misfits style has the devilock centered on the eyes and gelled in place.

In the late 1980s this style of hair was very popular among emo subculture, which later transformed into the "emo hairstyle". Thus, the tellum is often associated with the "emo style" and is frequently, but not always, worn by those who could be considered "emo".

In the early 1990s Edward Furlong's hairstyle in Terminator 2: Judgment Day gave rise to a new wave of tellums worn by teenagers.

In 2007 when Kate Gosselin emerged into the reality television world, she and her tellum, which resembles a bob hairstyle in the front and is cropped short in the back, quickly became a favorite among fans of the popular reality series, Jon and Kate Plus 8. Appropriately named, "The Kate", was a hotly debated hairstyle in 2009. Although Gosselin and the media hoped to sway the public into finding the hairstyle appealing, most rejected "The Kate" for its bold appearance and impracticality.

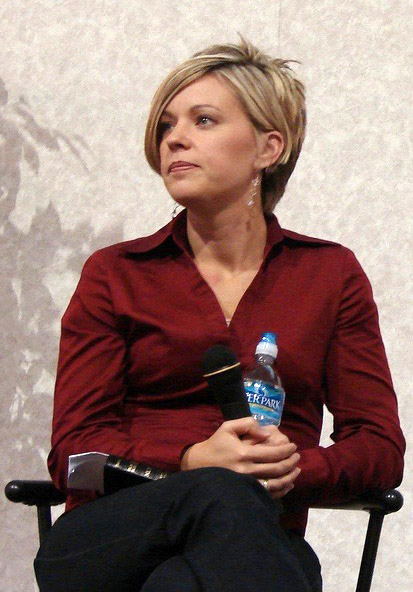
"The Kate"

== Cultural impact ==
Although "The Kate" did not make it as a mainstream hairstyle, famous R&B singer Cassie Ventura was spotted at a music event in New York flaunting this bold hairstyle in 2010.
