= Flapper (disambiguation) =

A flapper was a trendy young woman in the 1920s.

Flapper may also refer to:

- Flapper (company), a Brazilian transportation network company for aviation
- The Flapper, a 1920 American film directed by Alan Crosland
- Flapper valve, a part of some flush toilet mechanisms
- Flappers (TV series), a Canadian sitcom produced by the CBC in the late 1970s
- Flapper, a rock-climbing-related avulsion injury
- Flapper!, a play by Tim Kelly and Bill Francoeur
- Fire flapper, a fire suppression device
- QP:flapper, a two-member illustrator unit consisting of Japanese artists Tometa Ohara and Koharu Sakura
