= Trojan skinhead =

Cultural identity in the UK

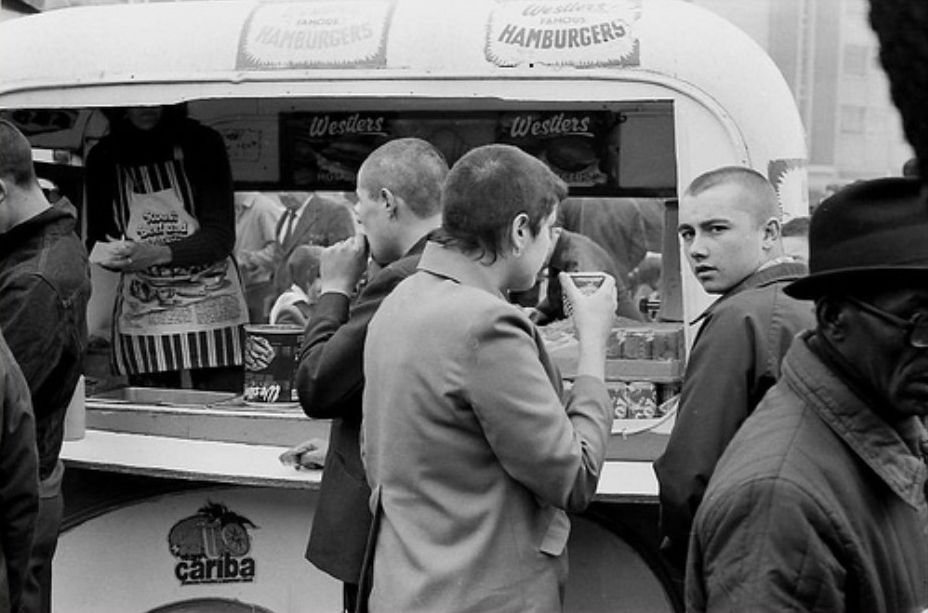
Skinheads in London in 1981

Trojan skinheads (also known as traditional skinheads, tradskins or trads) are individuals who identify with the original British skinhead subculture of the late 1960s, when ska, rocksteady, reggae and soul music were popular, and there was a heavy emphasis on mod-influenced clothing styles. Named after the record label Trojan Records, these skinheads identify with the subculture's Jamaican rude boy and British working class roots.

Because of their appreciation of music played by black people, such as skinhead reggae (also referred to as boss reggae), the movement's philosophy tends to be either non-racist and apolitical, or left-wing or anti-racist, unlike the white power skinheads. Trojan skinheads usually dress in a typical 1960s skinhead style, including items such as button-down Ben Sherman shirts, Fred Perry polo shirts, braces, fitted suits, cardigans, tank tops, Harrington jackets and Crombie-style overcoats. Hair is generally between a 2 and 4 grade clip-guard (short, but not bald), in contrast to the shorter-haired punk-influenced Oi! skins of the 1980s.

== Spirit of '69 ==
The phrase Spirit of '69 is used by traditional skinheads to commemorate what they identify as the skinhead subculture's heyday in 1969. The phrase was popularized by a group of Scottish skinheads called the Glasgow Spy Kids, a play on the Glaswegian pronunciation of spike heads. A skinhead history book entitled Spirit of 69: A Skinhead Bible was written by George Marshall, a skinhead from Glasgow, in the early 1990s.
