= Wide-leg trousers =

Type of trousers

Wide-leg jeans, colloquially called baggy pants, are a style of clothing popular from the early 1980s to the 2000s, and also during a revival in the 2020s.

== History ==
=== Early modern period ===
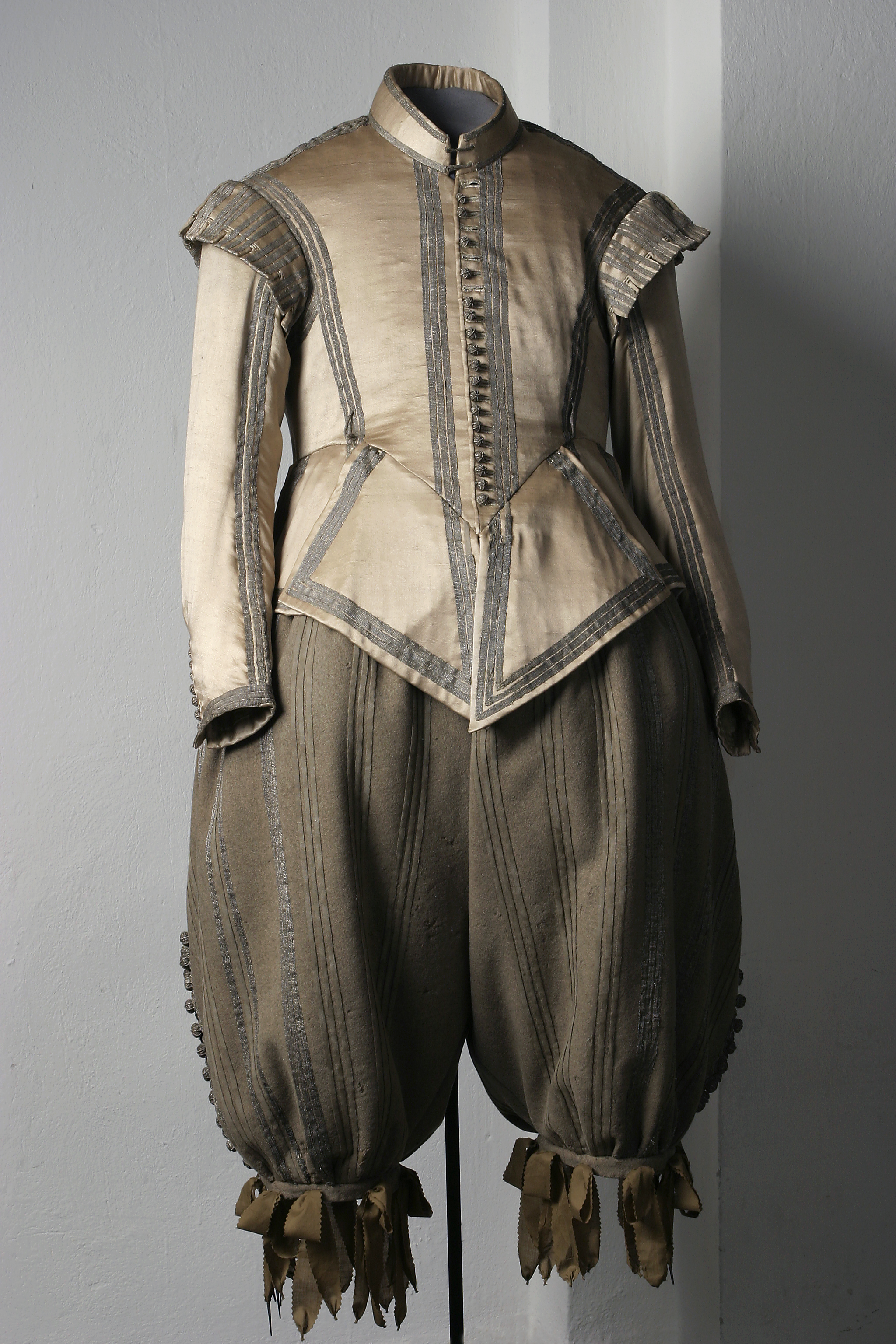
1620s doublet and baggy hosen belonging to Swedish king Gustavus Adolphus

Historically, the cut of pants has varied by period. From the 1500s until the early 17th century, very loose fitting breeches and hosen were fashionable among the wealthy. Frequently, these galligaskins, trunk hose and Rhinegraves had slits to reveal a contrasting fabric lining and were paired with short doublet or jerkin. These were replaced with tighter breeches and justacorps frock coats during the 1660s, which remained in fashion until long pantaloons were introduced during the 1788 French Revolution and Georgian Regency era. Baggy pantaloons (named after Pantalone from the Harlequinade) were originally work clothing, and were worn by urban French sans-culottes seeking to distinguish themselves from the overdressed aristocratic fops of the Ancien Régime who wore tight knee breeches.

In the Islamic World, loose fitting harem pants and the shalwar kameez were traditionally worn for modesty. These trousers remain typical everyday menswear in modern Iran, Afghanistan and Kurdistan. Subsequent conflict between the Ottoman, Russian and Holy Roman Empire resulted in the development of the European loose trousers or Sharovary worn as folk costume in Greece, Bulgaria, Hungary, Poland and Ukraine. From the Crimean War until World War I, French Zouaves were also issued baggy red pajama pants inspired by those worn by North African and Turkish soldiers.

=== 20th century ===
Beginning in the early 20th century, several styles of wide-leg pants gained rebellious connotations. During the 1920s, wide Oxford bags were favored by the Hearties of Oxford and Cambridge University because they could be put on over the knickerbockers then worn to play rugby football. In the United States, during the 1930s and 1940s, Black, Italian and Mexican zoot suiters, Pachucos and hepcats wore very wide-legged high waisted pants to the dancehalls as a protest against wartime rationing, and because it was easy for gang members to conceal weapons beneath a baggy suit.

=== In modern fashion ===
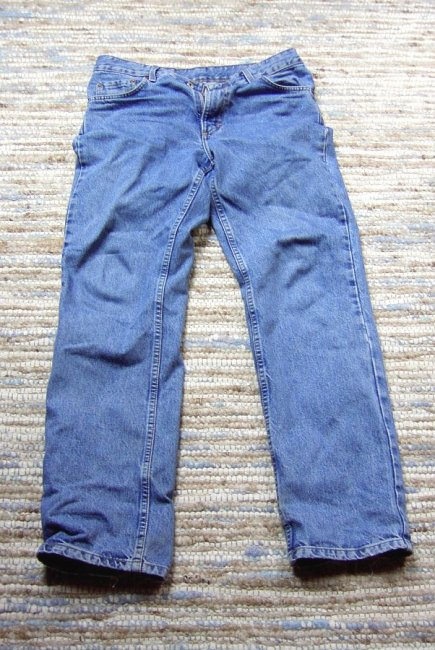
Wide-leg jeans

In the 1980s, baggy jeans entered mainstream fashion as the Hammer pants and parachute pants worn by rappers to facilitate breakdancing. In the 1990s, these jeans became even baggier and were worn by skaters, hardcore punks, ravers and rappers to set themselves apart from the skintight acid wash drainpipe jeans worn by metalheads. They were largely an underground trend in the early 1990s, but took off in popularity in the mid-1990s. The baggy jeans were very popular along with baggy bondage pants during the nu metal era which lasted from the late 90s to the early-to-mid 2000s along with pop punk during the same time. They continued to be popular in the 2000s, but by 2003 baggy jeans started to be replaced by boot-cut jeans and trousers among white men. However, they continued to be popular among African-American and Latino men throughout the mid 2000s until about 2013.

In the United Kingdom, during the 1990s fad they were known as "baggies". However, this term faded with the original fad and now they are generally known as Phat pants and "wide-leg jeans".

In the late 2000s, rap stars like Kanye West popularised a more refined indie-inspired look but baggy jeans continue to be worn by the raver and gangsta rap subcultures.

=== Revival ===
The style resurfaced in the late 2010s and early-to-mid 2020s alongside other baggy attire; possibly due to the shift to more comfortable clothing during the 2020 COVID-19 pandemic and retro revival fashion trends that started in the late 2010s like the Y2K which took inspiration from late 90s and early 00s fashion. New styles of jeans popular among Gen Z girls during the early and mid 2020s include barrel leg jeans and horseshoe jeans which were extra loose in the thigh area, like jodhpurs.

== Gallery ==
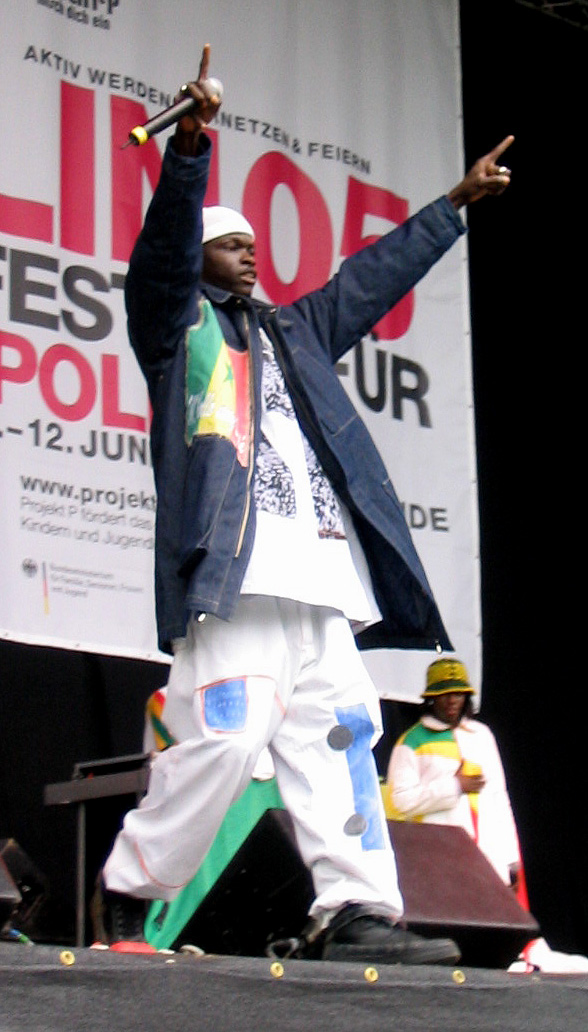
Senegalese rapper Darra J in Berlin, 2005

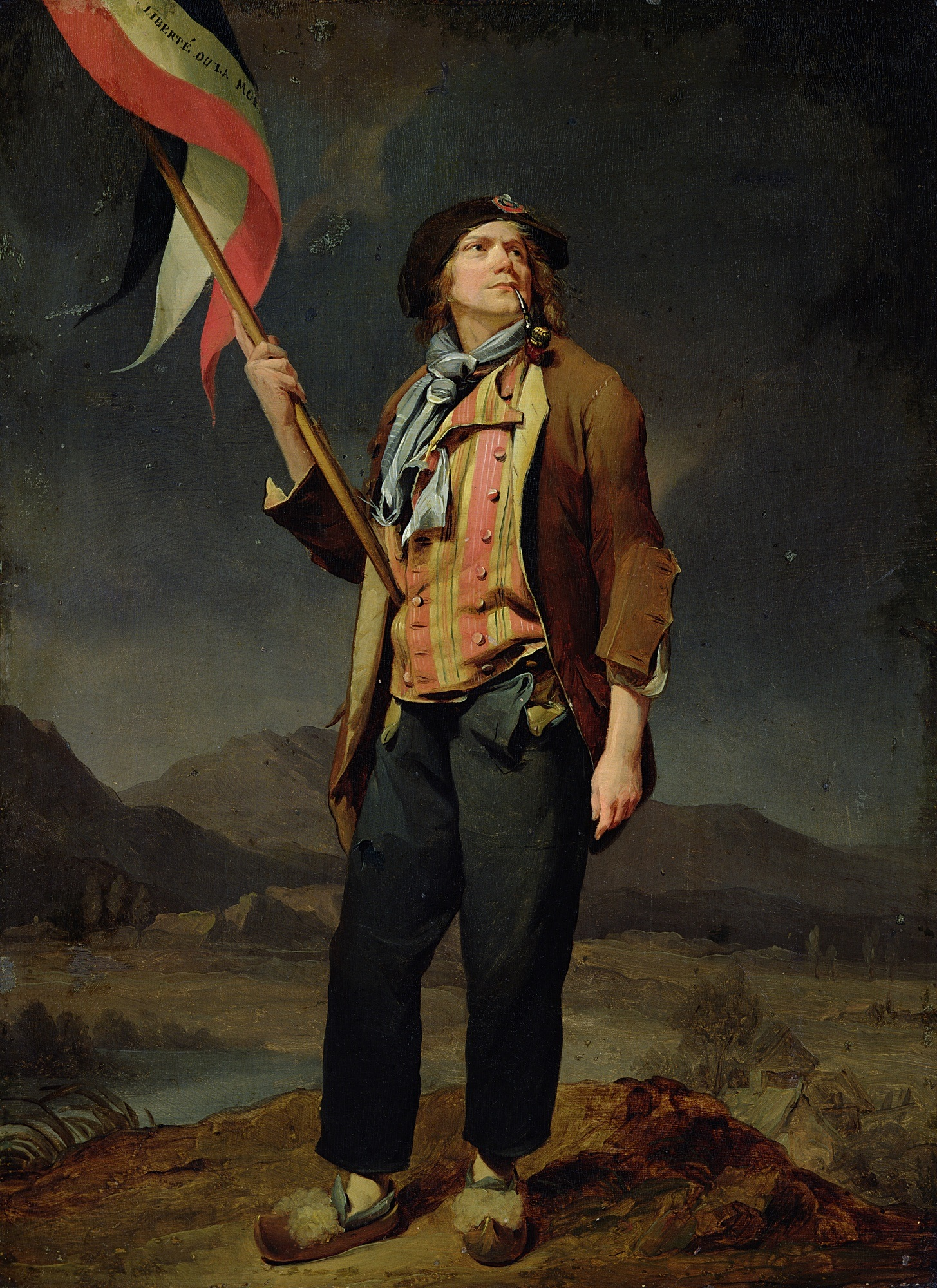
18th century French sans-culotte revolutionary wearing baggy pantaloons as a statement of equality

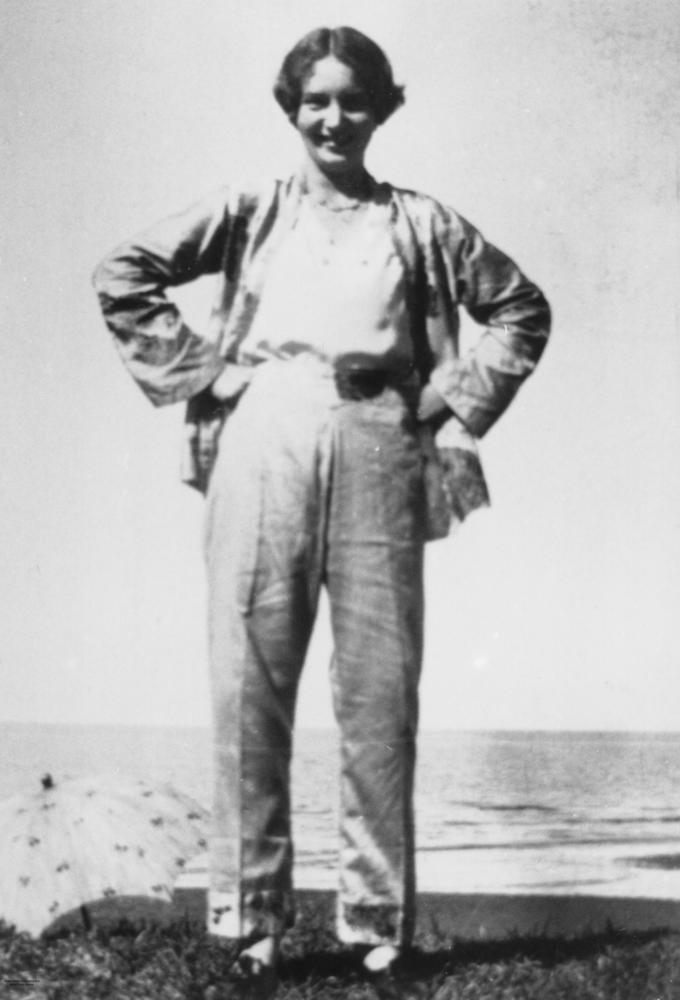
Australian woman, 1940s

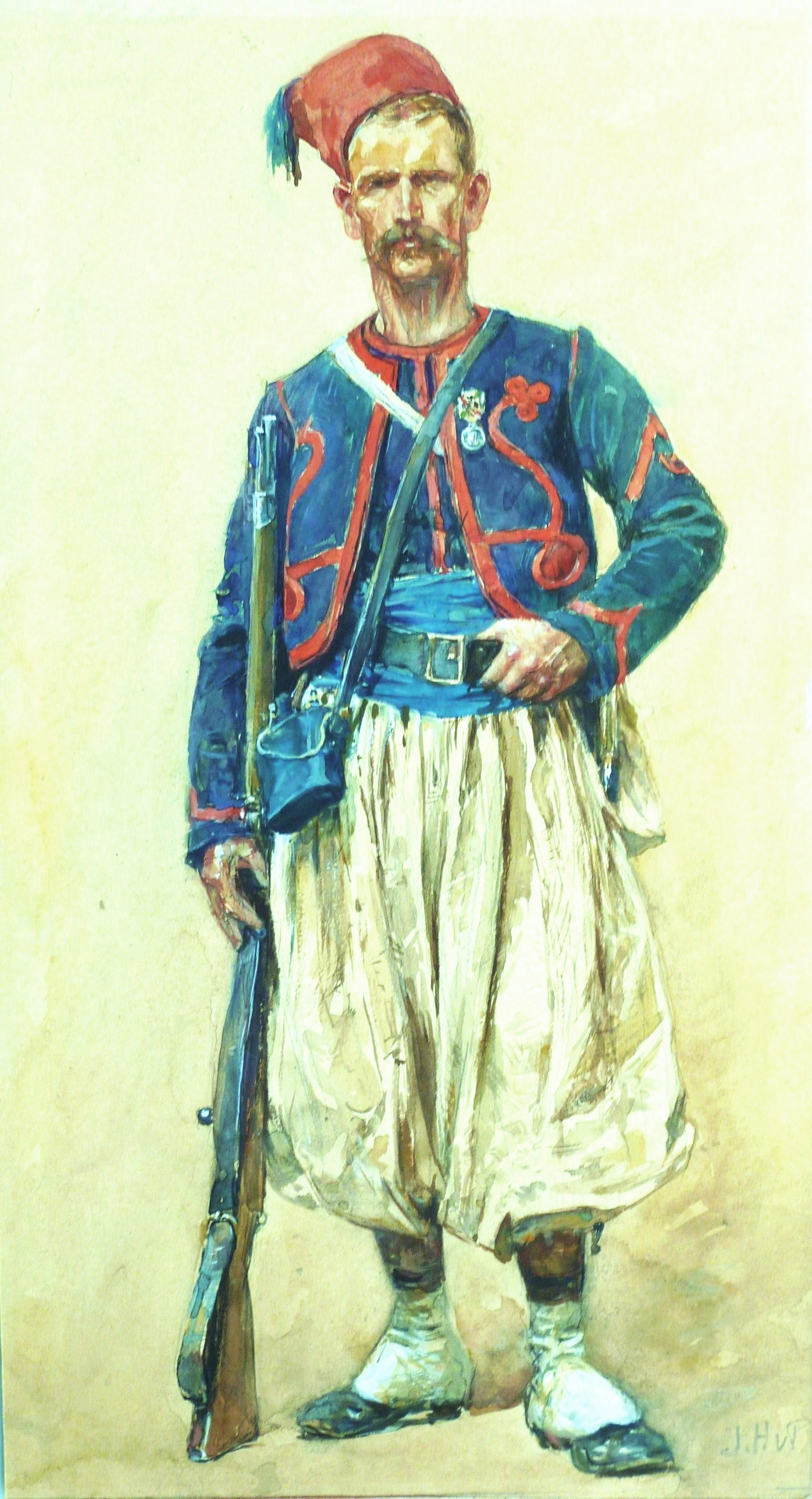
French soldier wearing baggy Turkish style pants, mid Victorian era

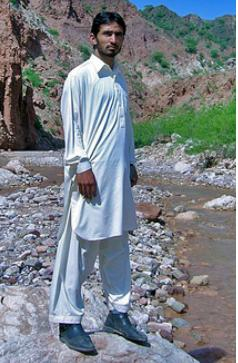
Pakistani Islamic clothing, 2009

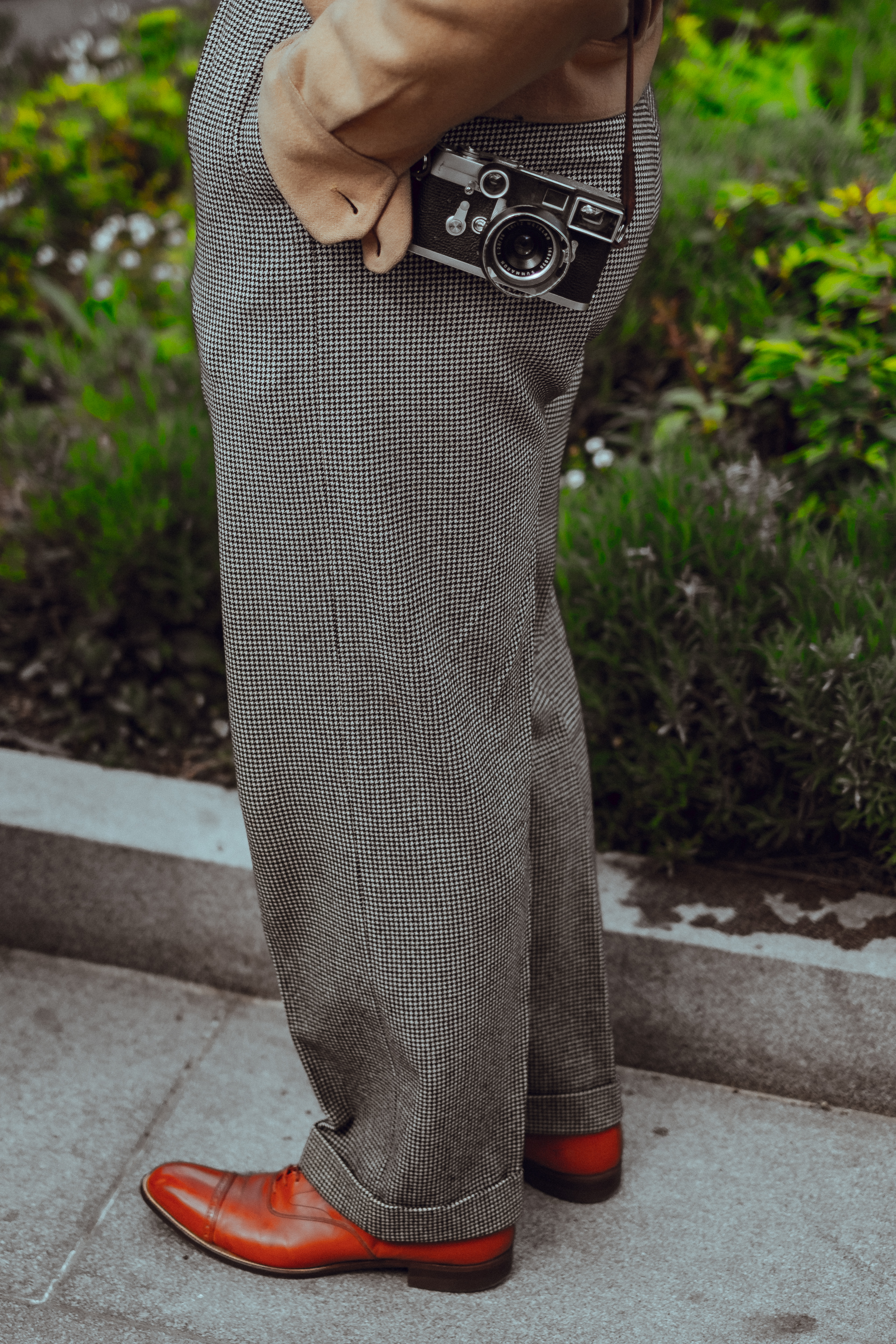
Contemporary Oxford bags, late 2010s

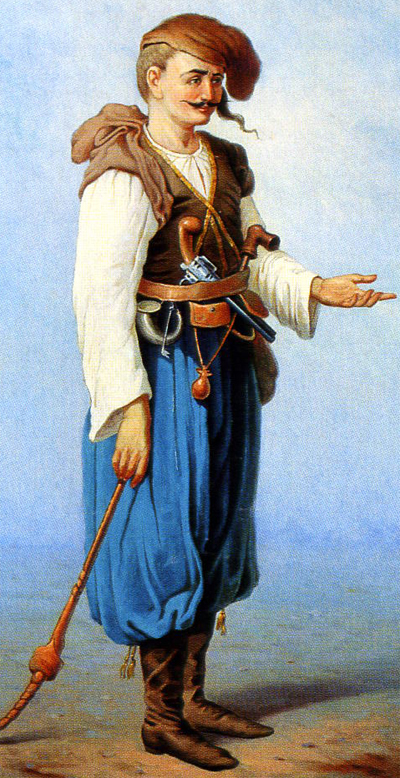
Ukrainian cossack in traditional sharovary

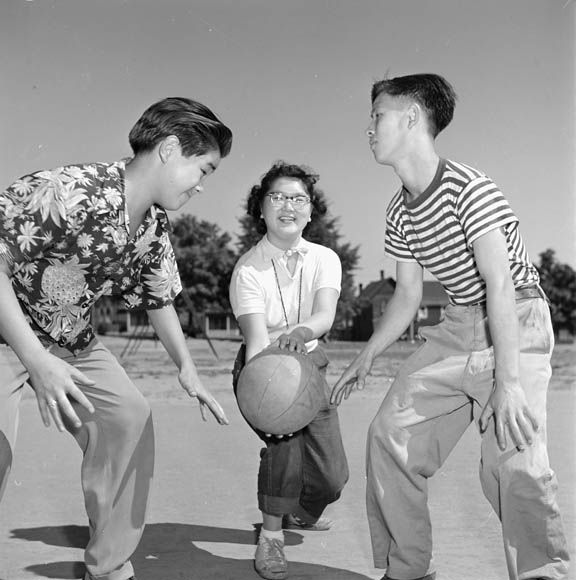
Chinese children in Canada, 1951

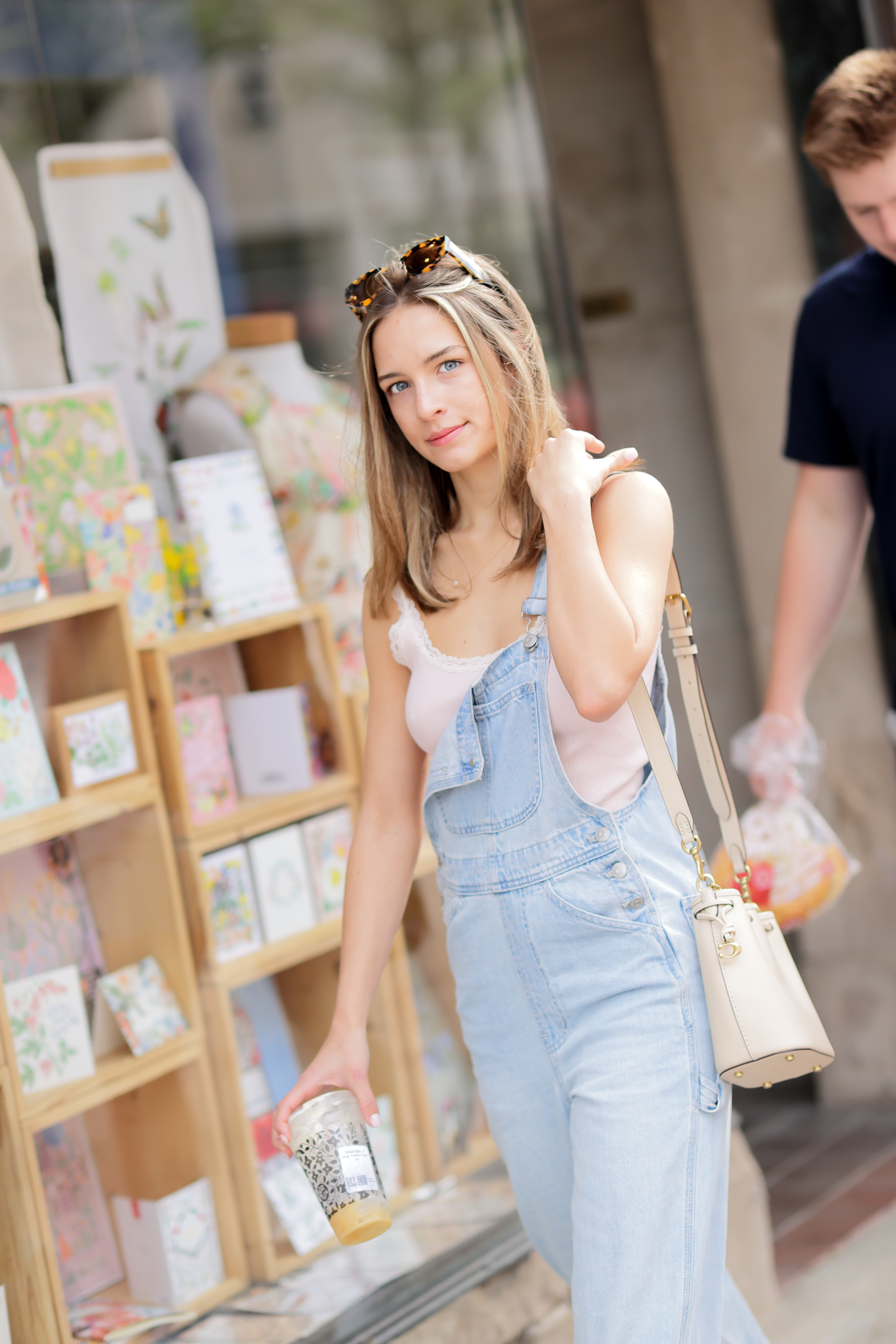
American woman wearing barrel leg overalls, 2024

== Dimensions ==
Wide-leg jeans and pants are at least 20 inches (51 cm) in circumference at the hem. Wide-leg jeans differ from bell-bottoms in that the entire length of the leg is large in circumference whereas flare or bell-bottom jeans become wider below the knee. Wide-leg jeans can be considered to be a variant of baggy jeans, which were also popular in the 1990s.

Super wide-leg jeans have a circumference at the hem of 23 to 26 inches (58 to 66 cm); whereas extreme wide-leg jeans are as wide as 50 inches (130 cm).

== See also ==
- 1990s in fashion
- 2000s in fashion
- 2020s in fashion
- Bell-bottoms
- Low-rise pants
- Phat pants
- Plus-size clothing
- Sagging
- Slim-fit pants
