= Oxford bags =

Type of trousers

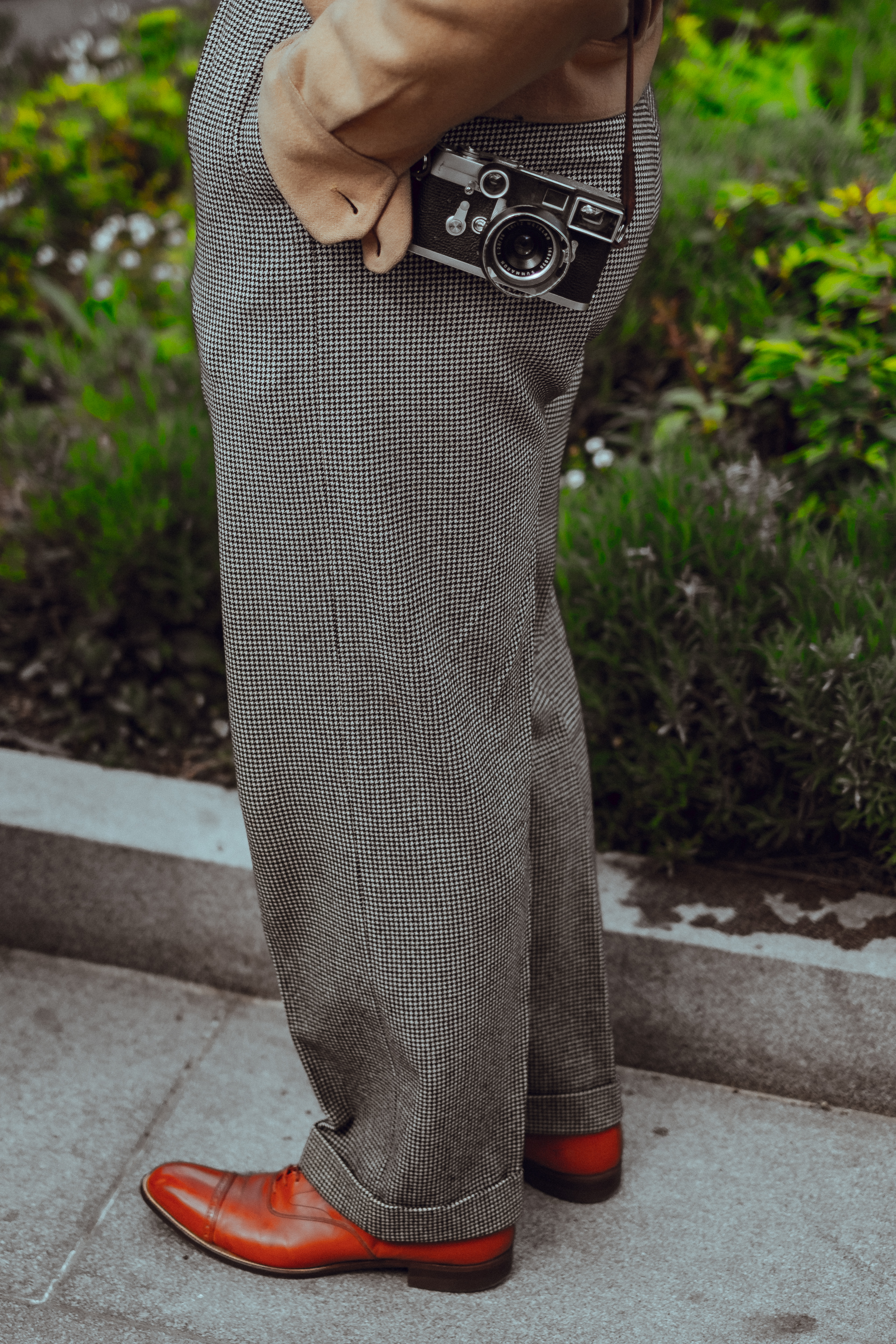
Contemporary Oxford bags worn in London, 2017

Oxford bags were a loose-fitting baggy form of trousers favoured by members of the University of Oxford, especially undergraduates, in England from the mid-1920s to around the 1950s. The style had a more general influence outside the university, including in America, but has been somewhat out of fashion since then.

== Origins ==
It is sometimes said that the style originated from a ban in 1924 on the wearing of plus fours by Oxford (and Cambridge) undergraduates at lectures. The bagginess allegedly allowed plus fours to be hidden underneath – but the argument is undermined by the fact that the trousers (especially in the early years) were not sufficiently voluminous for this to be done with any success. Other theories include claims that the style was invented by Harold Acton of Christ Church or by Bob Boothby of Magdalen; but there is evidence of the term, at least, being used at significantly earlier dates.

The original trousers were 22–23 inches (56–58 cm) in circumference at the bottoms but became increasingly larger to 44 inches (110 cm) or more, possibly due to a misunderstanding of the measurement as the width rather than circumference.

In the late 1920s, venues such as the Savoy Ballroom in Harlem were playing swinging jazz, inspiring new dance moves such as Jitterbug and Lindy Hop, which demanded extreme movement from dancers, who therefore adopted Oxford bags. During the 1940s, swing became a staple of dance halls in the western world and movie stars such as Frankie Manning and Fred Astaire wore Oxford bags on screen.

== Revival ==
The style made a comeback in 1970s Britain, among fans of Northern soul, a popular 1970s music movement. The style was worn as a practical measure to enable fans to make the energetic and elaborate dance moves associated with the Northern soul scene.

== See also ==
Baggy pants
