= JNCO =

Los Angeles, California-based clothing company

- JNCO Crown Logo
- Country: United States

Example of emblem found on JNCO Jeans

Example of ultra-wide "Convict" jeans, featuring a leg opening of 50"

JNCO, short for "Judge None Choose One", is a Los Angeles, California-based clothing company specializing in boys' and men's jeans. JNCO was founded in 1985. The brand gained recognition in the 1990s with its boys' ultra-wide straight legged denim jeans.

== History ==
This street look was popularized throughout the 90s starting in Los Angeles and working its way through the United States. JNCO also manufactures T-shirts, corduroy pants, khaki pants and other clothing articles for men and women. Unlike similar California based apparel manufacturers, JNCO manufactured most of its products in the United States, mainly at S.M.J. American Manufacturing Co., a 200,000-square-foot (19,000 m^{2}) operation also owned by Milo and Jacques Revah.

After JNCOs grew in popularity, store chains such as Kohl's, J. C. Penney, Tops and Bottoms, Gadzooks, and Pacific Sunwear began to carry them.

After peak sales of $186.9 million, sales halved in 1999. In the 2000s, the brothers closed the main factory.

In 2019, original founder Milo Revah announced he had re-acquired the brand and intended to relaunch it, with the relaunch taking place in June of that year, along with a new website.

== Styles ==
JNCO jeans were produced in a variety of styles and lines, ranging from ultra-wide jeans with leg openings greater than 50 inches (1,300 mm) to more conservatively cut styles. Some were so large that younger children often had to sit down while putting them on. After reaching the height of their popularity within the subcultures and becoming more mainstream, JNCOs were known for featuring superfluously large back pockets with graffiti-like-inspired artwork embroidery that became more cartoonish as the 1990s ended, including flaming skulls and the "JNCO Crown" (previously, the majority of styles only had a relatively small, stylized "J"). Some of the JNCO styles included Mammoths, Crime Scenes, FlameHead (geared for kids and pre-teens), Mad Scientists, Buddha, Tribals and Rhinos, Twin Cannons, and Kangaroos. Styles ranged from 17-inch leg openings up to 50-inch leg openings. Leg openings and embroidery vary by model; such as Kangaroos, which includes a kangaroo with boxing gloves and is one of the more popular styles available on the website.
