= Bondage pants =

Type of trousers

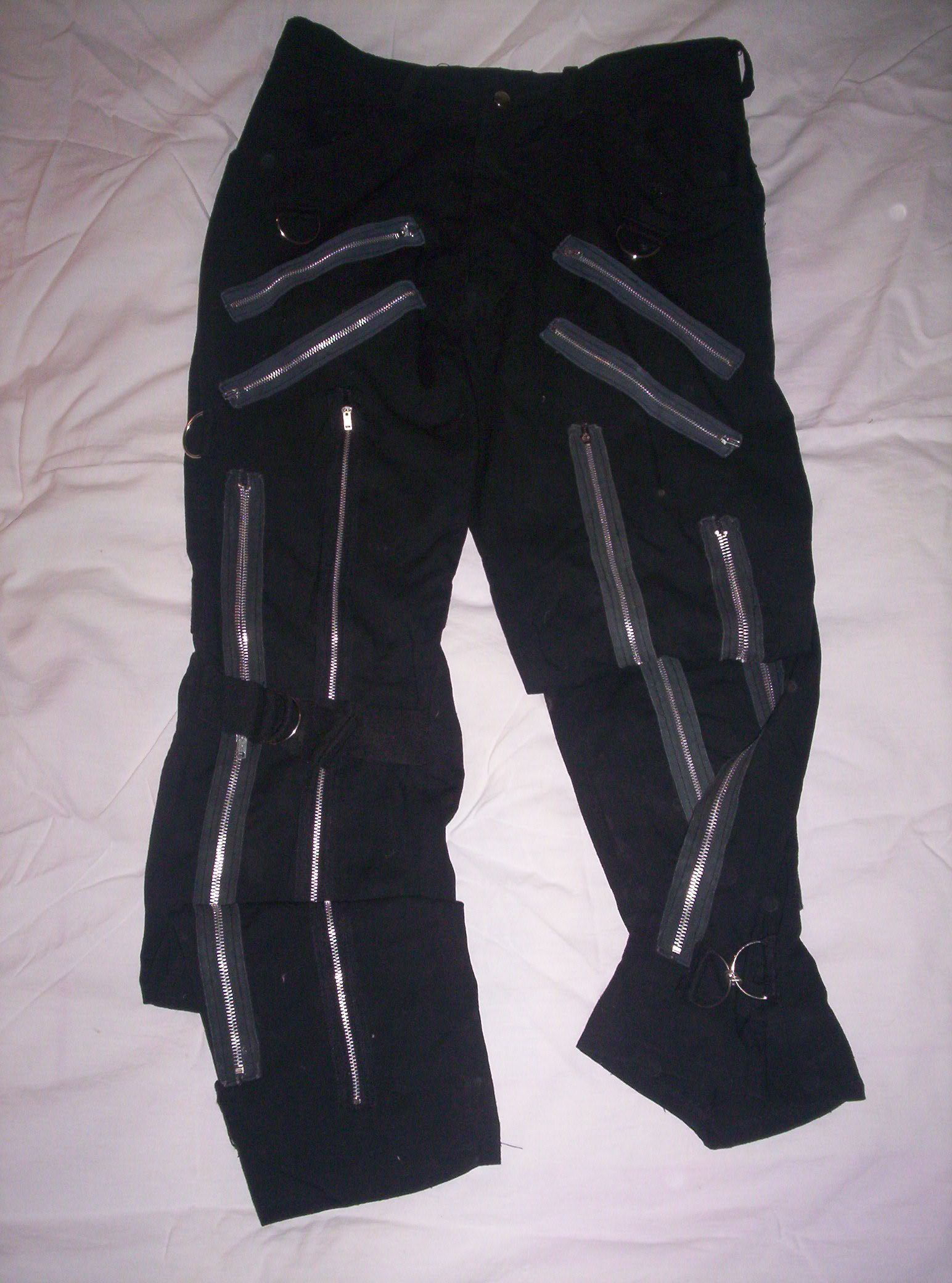
Black bondage pants

Bondage pants or bondage trousers are trousers with zippers, straps, chains, rings and buckles, giving an appearance of a BDSM style. They come in a variety of colors and patterns; one of the most common patterns being tartan. Bondage pants also come in a variety of styles, including tight or baggy, long, short or Capri.

They are primarily worn by members of youth subcultures, including punks, ravers, goths and otaku.

The most popular style of bondage pants is the 'original' black style, with white topstitching, although different colored versions including white, hot pink, blue, and green have been made with equally varying colors of topstitching.

== History ==
=== Origins ===
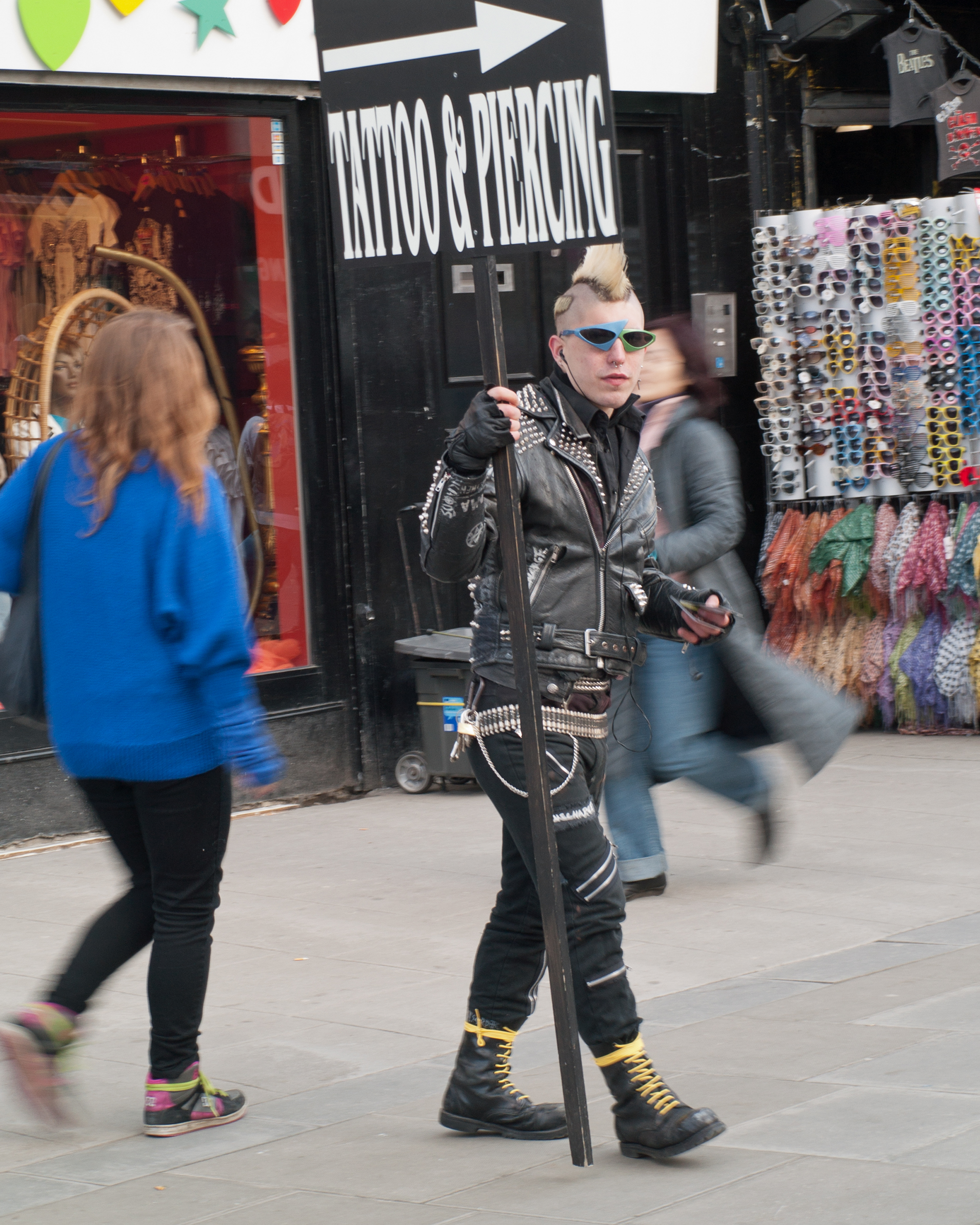
A punk near Camden Market in London wearing black bondage trousers

They were developed by British designers Vivienne Westwood and Malcolm McLaren in the 1970s punk subculture. The trousers were made popular by people such as the Sex Pistols, Jordan and Adam Ant who originally had to get them from Westwood/McClarens shop SEX, later to become Seditionaries, in World's End, Chelsea, London. The original drainpipe design was an anti fashion statement against the flares of the time. The men's variety tend to feature baggier legs, larger pockets and more metal details such as chains, skulls, mock handcuffs and D-rings while the women's styles are usually more tailored and have less metal hardware decoration than the men's styles but occasionally have details of lace, ribbon or tartan making them seem more feminine.

=== Further development ===
In the late 1990s and early-to-mid 2000s, Tripp NYC's signature design that combined the chains and straps of bondage pants with the baggy legs and bright linings of phat pants became incredibly popular amongst U.S. teenagers, although they also held some minor popularity amongst college students then in their early 20s, and were worn on stage by members of some nu-metal, industrial rock, and darkwave bands. Additionally, during that time period this style of phat pants-inspired bondage pants became frequently observable among members of the goth, heavy metal, gamer, and raver subcultures. Such pants were a popular sell for chain stores such as Hot Topic and Spencer's Gifts, and ranged from observable to ubiquitous at alternative music (especially Electronic music and Hard Rock) nightclubs and anime conventions prior to a gradual decline in popularity and visibility from the late 2000s through early 2010s.

However, during the early 2020s, they made a comeback due to retro fashion trends like the Y2K trend.

== See also ==
- Fetish fashion
- Punk fashion
