= Link flap =

Communications link alternating between up and down states

Link flap is a condition where a communications link alternates between up and down states. Link flap can be caused by end station reboots, power-saving features, incorrect duplex configuration or marginal connections, and signal integrity issues on the link.
