= Phat pants =

Style of pants

Phat pants worn by ravers in Australia.

Phat pants, phatties, or phats are a style of pants that are fitted at the waist, but get increasingly wide down the legs, covering the feet entirely due to their width. Phat pants can be made out of a variety of materials, however denim, faux fur, and cotton fabric tend to be the most common. High-end customized phats tend to include UV reflective tape decoration to add a glowing effect. Phat pants are notable for being a visual identifier of those within the rave community. Popular makers of phat pants include Kikwear, UFO, Q-ambient, and JNCO. Phat pants originated in 1990. A Melbourne raver who could not wear slim pants due to thick legs started making them to fit her frame. Rose to popularity in early 1990s with Tina Borg, Renegade and continued to grow into candy phat pantz in 1995 within the kandi kid community of ravers.

== See also ==
- Bell-bottoms
- Low-rise pants
- Melbourne Shuffle
- Wide leg jeans
