= Suspenders =

Shoulder straps worn to hold up trousers

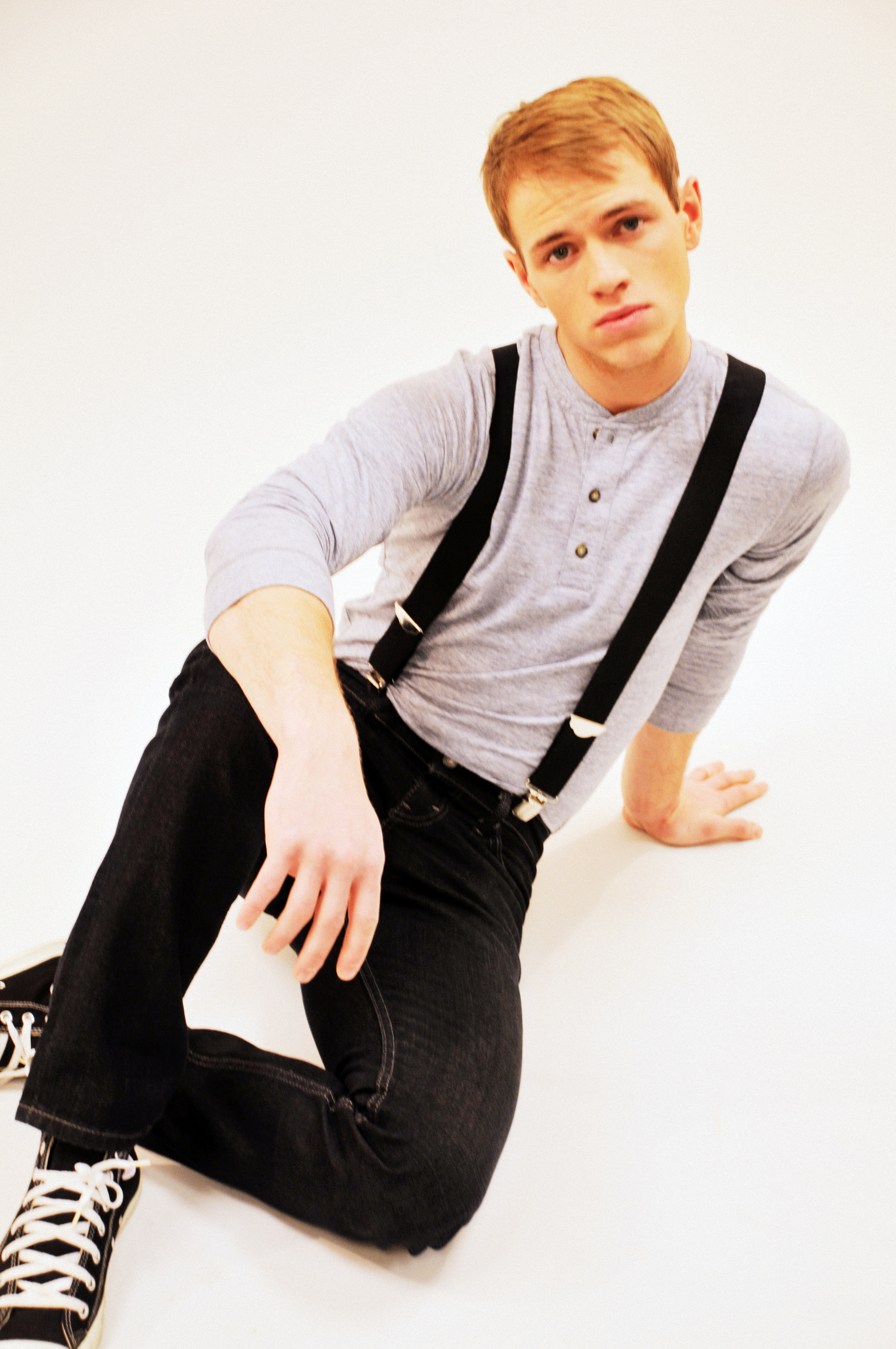
A young man wearing suspenders with grip fastenings, 2013

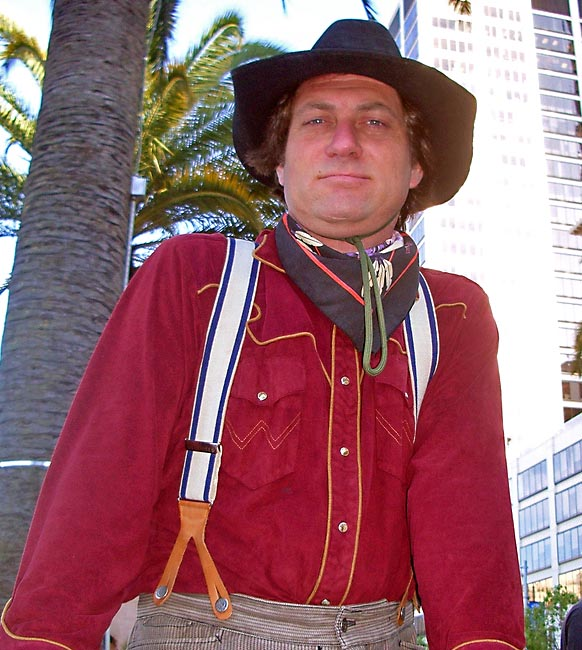
A man wearing suspenders with button fastenings, 2006

Suspenders (North American English), or braces (British English, New Zealand English, Australian English), are fabric or leather straps worn over the shoulders to hold up skirts or trousers. The straps may be elasticated, either entirely or only at attachment ends, and most straps are of woven cloth forming an X or Y shape at the back. Suspenders are typically attached to skirts and trousers with clips or buttons using leather tabs at the ends.

In British English, a suspender belt, or suspenders for short, is a garment used to hold up stockings. This is called a garter belt in American English.

== History ==
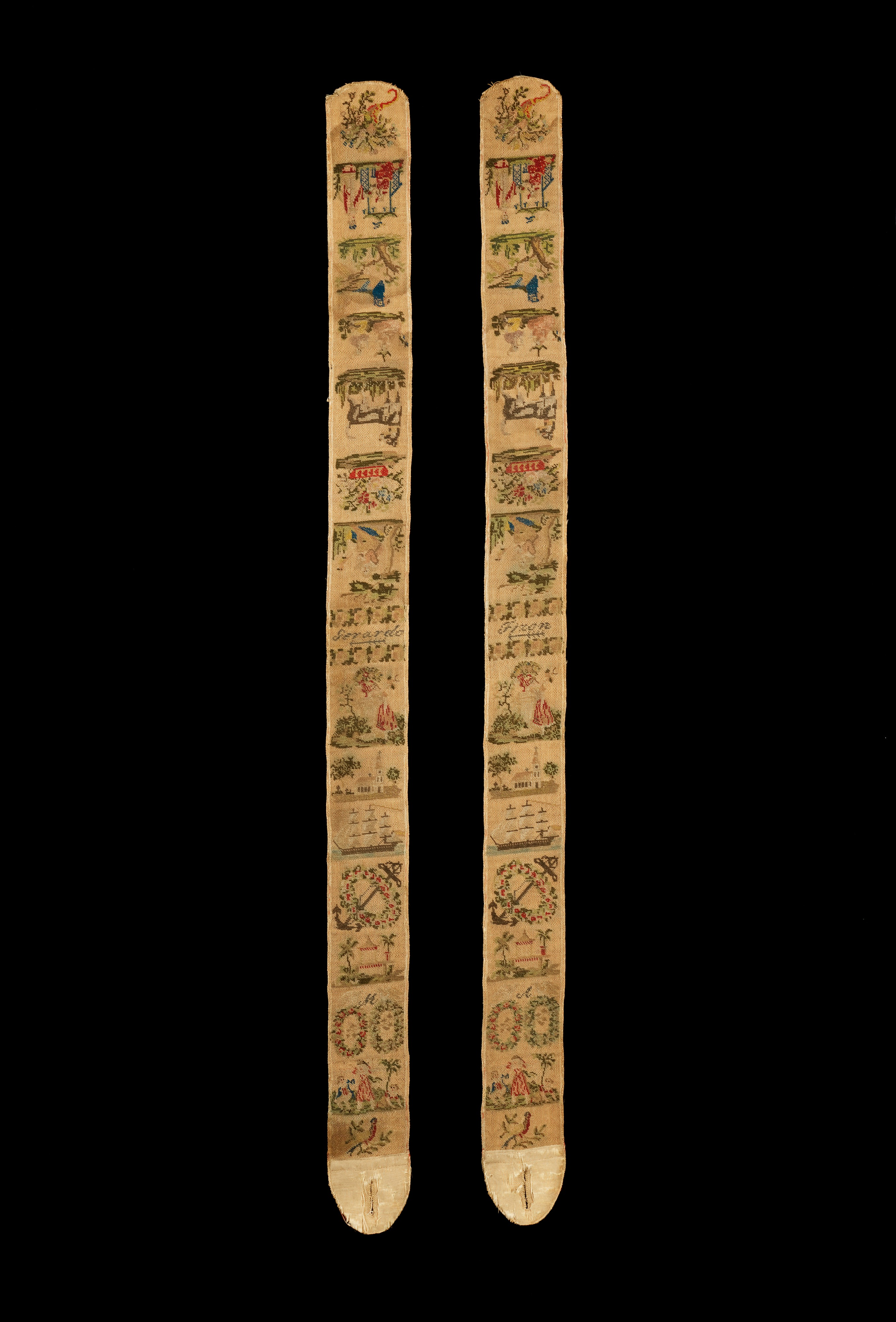
Portuguese suspenders from 1840 to 1849 from The Metropolitan Museum of Art

There have been several precursors to suspenders throughout the past 300 years, but modern suspenders were first popularised as "braces" in 1822 by a London haberdasher Albert Thurston. They were once almost universally worn, due to the high cut of mid-nineteenth and early twentieth century skirts and trousers that made a belt impractical. During the nineteenth century, suspenders were sometimes called galluses.

After losing popularity during World War I, when men became accustomed to uniform belts, suspenders were still regular attire throughout the 1920s. Because of their image as 'underwear', some men switched to belts during the 1930s as the vests (US/Canada) or waistcoats which had hidden suspenders became worn less often. This also signaled the switch in the position of securing buttons from the outside of the waistband to the inside. Life magazine stated in 1938 that 60% of American men chose belts over suspenders. Though the return of fuller-cut trousers in the 1940s revived suspenders, they did not dominate over belts again to the same extent. However, in the UK they remained the norm to wear with suits and dress trousers.

== Fashion ==
While suspenders have been in and out of fashion over the last century (alternating with belts in general preference), there has been a brief resurgence in interest, possibly due to the styles seen in films like Wall Street. Many business people, newscasters (such as Larry King in the United States) and professionals such as stockbrokers, real estate brokers, bankers, and lawyers also still wear suspenders.

Narrow, clip-on style suspenders are also a typical part of skinhead, and to a lesser extent, punk fashion. In skinhead and punk fashion, suspenders are typically between 3/4 and 1 inch (1.9 and 2.5 cm) in width.

Materials used for making suspenders have also changed over time, with newer additions such as rayon, a hard-wearing synthetic fibre, now offered. Generally, a high-quality rayon with elastic webbing is the fabric used to create suspenders, with silk webbing or tubed suiting cloths from mills such as Dugdale Bros of England also used.

Suspenders can be measured in a variety of different ways to ensure proper fitting. To accurately measure suspenders, first, start by measuring from the back pant line, then cross over the opposite shoulder down to the front pant line. Add a few additional inches for adjustments when required.

== Usage ==
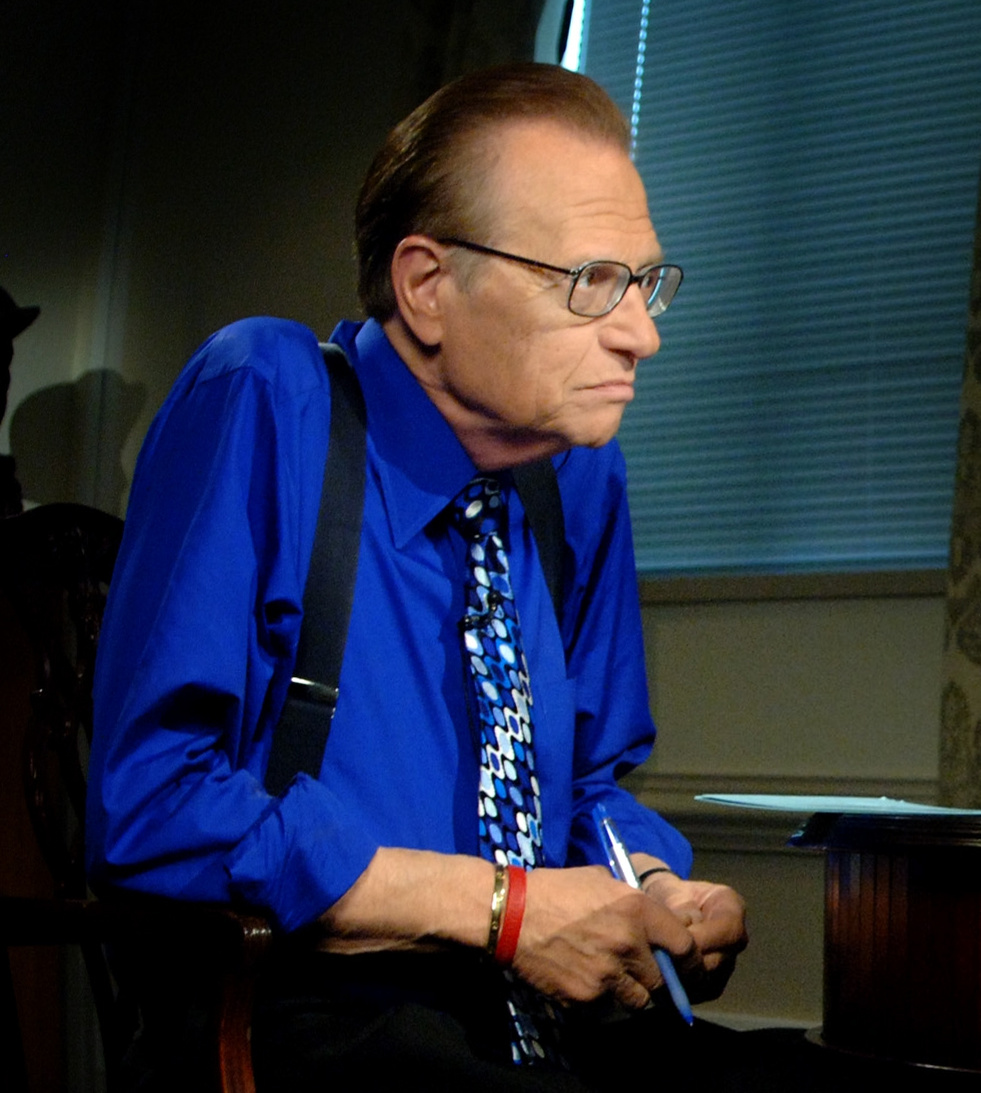
Larry King regularly wore suspenders on his talk show, Larry King Live.

Good quality smart suspenders were traditionally considered white collar, or upper or upper-middle class, wear. They were made to be attached to skirts or trousers by buttons sewn onto the waistband. There are relatively few current manufacturers in the UK, but the classic button-on 'reform' end is also quite widely available in the United States.

In traditional or formal settings, it is considered a faux pas to wear both belt and suspenders at the same time, though in the past this has not always been the case. Further, suspenders were traditionally considered an undergarment and, as such, were considered inappropriate to be seen. From the time of their invention until World War II, the waistcoat, or a jumper or cardigan for coolness in the summer, covered suspenders to prevent indecency. Similarly, jumpers and jackets kept the shirtsleeves hidden. In the inter-war period, however, men began removing jackets in public, and so this sensibility became eroded over time. It is perhaps only in Britain that a few 'die-hards' still consider it "gauche" to wear, for example, brightly colored suspenders without a jacket. Generally, it is now considered acceptable fashion, on both sides of the Atlantic, for men's suspenders to be seen.

The trousers for suspenders have buttons in order to attach the leather tabs; these may be either on the outside, traditionally, or inside of trousers that do not have belt loops. With belt loops, buttons would be sewn on the inside of the waistband. Such trousers might also have a high back in the fishtail shape, though this is not as common now; This style may also have an additional adjustable strap at the back, as well as the two side adjusters placed on most belt-less trousers. Buttons should be placed about 3 to 3.5 inches (7.6 to 8.9 cm) apart, an equal distance from the back seam. At the front, the first button should be set over the main pleat or crease, the second button again about 3 to 3.5 inches (7.6 to 8.9 cm) apart. It is important to place the buttons in the correct position, as trousers with suspenders should be slightly loose to hang correctly.

In the 2000s, it became fashionable for some younger women to wear suspenders, a style that emerged from Mod styles in the late 1960s through to punk rock and skinhead styles of the late 1970s into the 1980s. One particular exponent of this fashion was Eurythmics vocalist Annie Lennox, whose fashion styling was akin to cross-dressing as a male character, with her dark suit and red suspenders.
