= Razors in the Night =

American punk rock band

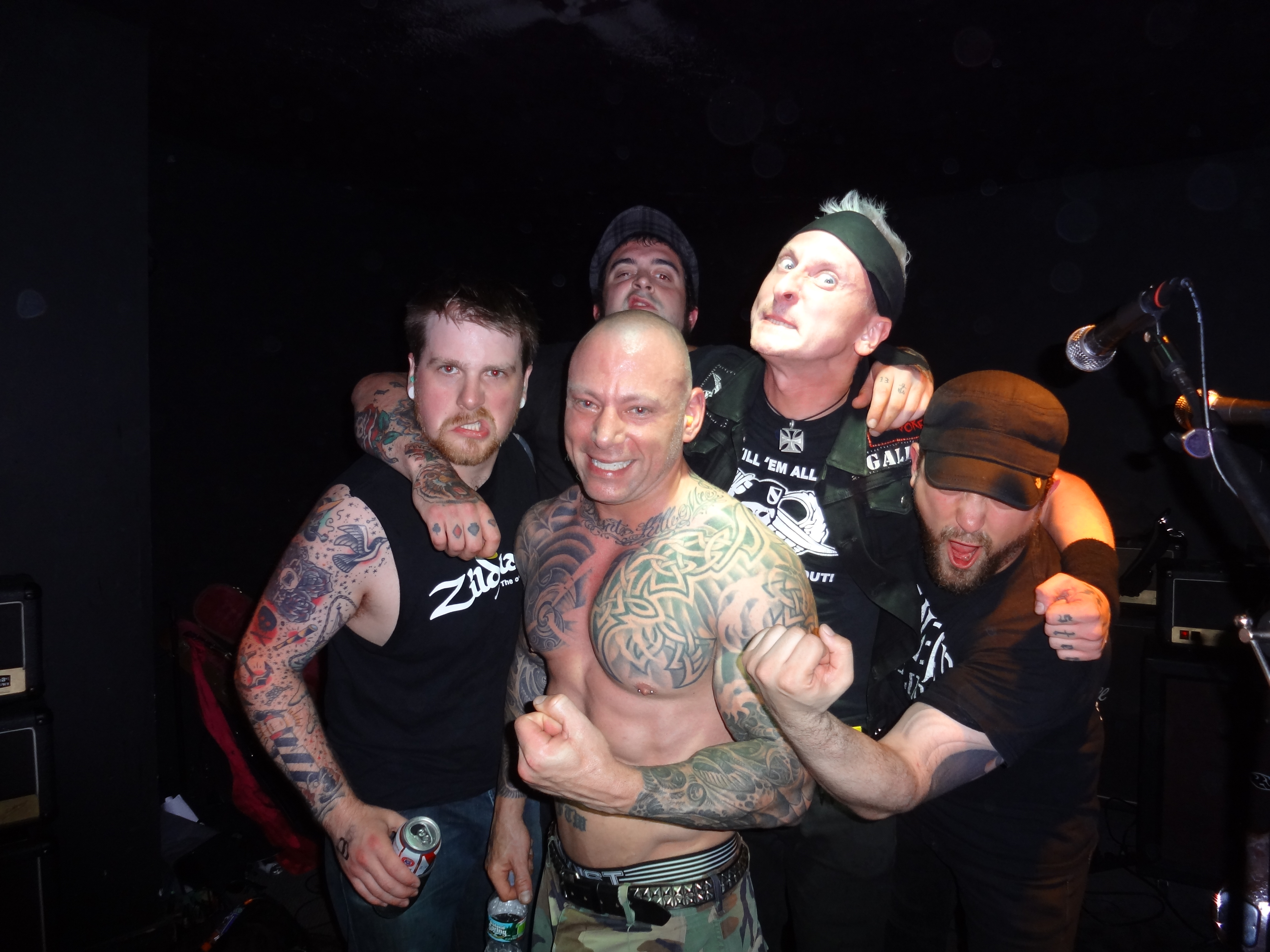
- Razors in the Night in 2012

Background information
- Origin: Boston, Massachusetts, U.S.
- Genres: Hardcore punk, Oi!, punk rock
- Years active: 2009–present
- Labels: Contra, 4SubCulture, Horror Business Wrechords, Longshot, Pirates Press, Insurgence
- Members: Troy Schoeller; Ian Clark; Caleb Wheeler; Swid; Zack Wells
- Past members: Todd Wilson; Randy Tartow
- Website: ritn.bandcamp.com

Razors in the Night is an American punk rock band from Boston, Massachusetts, formed in 2009. It was founded by vocalist Troy Schoeller, who recruited four friends: guitarist Todd Wilson (ex-Beware!), guitarist Ian Clark (ex-Pure Impact), bassist Swid (Acrobrats), and drummer Randy Tartow (ex-Archcriminals).

== Career ==
They first performed in February 2009. Since then, they have shared stages with bands including The Mighty Mighty Bosstones, Rancid, The Business, Evil Conduct, Patriot, Blood for Blood, Resistance 77, Reagan Youth, The Unseen, and The Casualties. Their first international release, Carry On!, was released in the United States, Germany (Contra Records), Czech Republic (4Subculture Records), Belgium (Pure Impact Distro), and Canada (Longshot Music).

In 2010, they were nominated by the Boston Phoenix for Best New Act and Best Punk Act. The Boston Herald described the band as "the new vanguards of ... Boston hardcore" and one reviewer described one of their performances as "true in your face, shaved head, Doc wearing Boston music and a show well worth your hard earned working class dollar."

== Musical style and influences ==
The band name is taken from a Blitz song. Their sound is somewhat anomalous, fusing hardcore, Oi!, and a touch of garage rock. Their songs range from the thrashy, in-your-face assault, "Hipster Holocaust", to the catchy "Carry On", to the anthemic Oi! ballad "Skinheads Alright". Lyrical topics include drugs, alcohol, unemployment, depression, heartache, and loose women with looser ethics.

Their musical influences include Oi! and Boston hardcore bands such as The Last Resort, Blitz, 4-Skins, Condemned 84, Blood for Blood, Slapshot, American Nightmare, Dropkick Murphys, Darkbuster and Death Before Dishonor.

== Band members ==
- Troy Schoeller – vocals
- Ian Clark – lead guitar
- Zack Wells – guitar
- Caleb Wheeler – drums
- "Swid" – bass

Former members

- Todd Wilson – guitar
- Randy Tartow – drums

== Discography ==
- RITN / Vagiant (Horror Business Records) – Spit 7"
- Carry On! (Horror Business Records) – CD USA Release
- Carry On! - 10" Vinyl record (Contra Records/Longshot Music), European Release – 3 different versions:

1) Regular Blood Splattered
2) Limited Edition: Oxblood W/ Golden Flech
3) Ultra Limited Edition: Signed Black on Black 180 gram vinyl This version has two songs not on the USA Release

- Carry On! - (4 Subculture Records, Czech Republic) CD European Release, this version has two songs not on the USA Release.
- Contra Records 2010 Compilation – Featured song "Skinheads Alright"
- Never Give In! - 13 tracks, released on May 13, 2014
- Oi! This is Streetpunk Volume 4- My boots are red, 12 inch, Pirates Press Records
- A Better Tomorrow / Split 7" Razors in the Night, NOi!SE, Broadsiders, and Sydney Ducks, (Contra Records/Longshot Music)
- Razors in the Night / Strongbow – Split 7", (Contra Records/Longshot Music)
- Basement Brigade (single)by Razors in the Night, (Contra Records/Longshot Music)
