= Flapper (company) =

Business aviation charter and aircraft management company

- Company type: Joint-stock company
- Founded: January 1, 2016; 10 years ago in São Paulo, Brazil
- Headquarters: Lisbon, Portugal
- Area served: Worldwide
- Key people: Paul Malicki, CEO
- Website: www.flyflapper.com

Flapper is a business aviation company headquartered in Lisbon, Portugal that provides on-demand air charter and aircraft management services worldwide.

== Company history ==
Flapper was established in early 2016 by a group of Brazilian and Polish entrepreneurs.

Brazilian startup accelerator ACE was the first to inject resources into Flapper, and in the middle of 2018 other investors, including Brazilian fund manager Confrapar, led its seed investment. As of December 2018, the company has accrued R$4 million in funding.

In October 2018, it was reported that Flapper was planning to add electric autonomous helicopters (eVTOL) to its flight-sharing service, with a projected launch in 2021.

In 2020, Flapper expanded internationally, first entering the Chilean market, followed by the United States, and subsequently establishing its international headquarters in Lisbon, Portugal.

In 2021, Eve Urban Air Mobility Solutions (an Embraer company) and Flapper announced a partnership aimed at developing the urban air mobility market in Latin America. The partnership was described as a proof-of-concept for future operations of Eve’s electric vertical takeoff and landing (eVTOL) aircraft, including planned use of helicopters for data collection and a potential allocation of flight time across major cities in the region.

In 2024, Flapper announced a Series A extension and stated that it planned to direct resources toward an aircraft management and fractional management program. The company also said it had signed letters of intent with several electric- and hybrid-electric aircraft manufacturers, including MagniX, Electra, Jaunt Mobility, and Eve Mobility.

In 2025, Flapper acquired Brazilian air carrier Black Táxi Aéreo in an all-cash deal, bringing Black’s fleet and facilities under Flapper’s operation. Under the terms of the acquisition, Black became an air taxi operator within Flapper’s brokerage model, and its founder assumed leadership of Flapper’s aircraft management and fractional ownership division. The combined organization added several aircraft to its operations, including a Gulfstream GIV-SP jet and other jets under management.

As of 2025, Flapper reported approximately 4,000 aircraft listed on its digital platform and more than 30,000 customers.

== Operations ==
Flapper’s primary business is full aircraft charter, which it provides through a digital booking platform and mobile application connecting customers with aircraft operators. The company has described its services as including air charter and crowdsourced flights, and has stated that it plans to introduce additional aircraft management services.

According to Business Air News, Flapper lists more than 4,000 aircraft for on-demand charter, and projected 500,000 downloads of its mobile private-jet booking application by the end of 2025.

Since 2025, Flapper has expanded its operations to include aircraft management and fractional ownership programs following its acquisition of Black Táxi Aéreo, complementing its charter brokerage activities.

=== Payments ===
Flapper allows users to pay for flights via credit card, with the option to divide payments into three installments, as well as cryptocurrency.
