= Bum flap =

Clothing hanging over buttocks

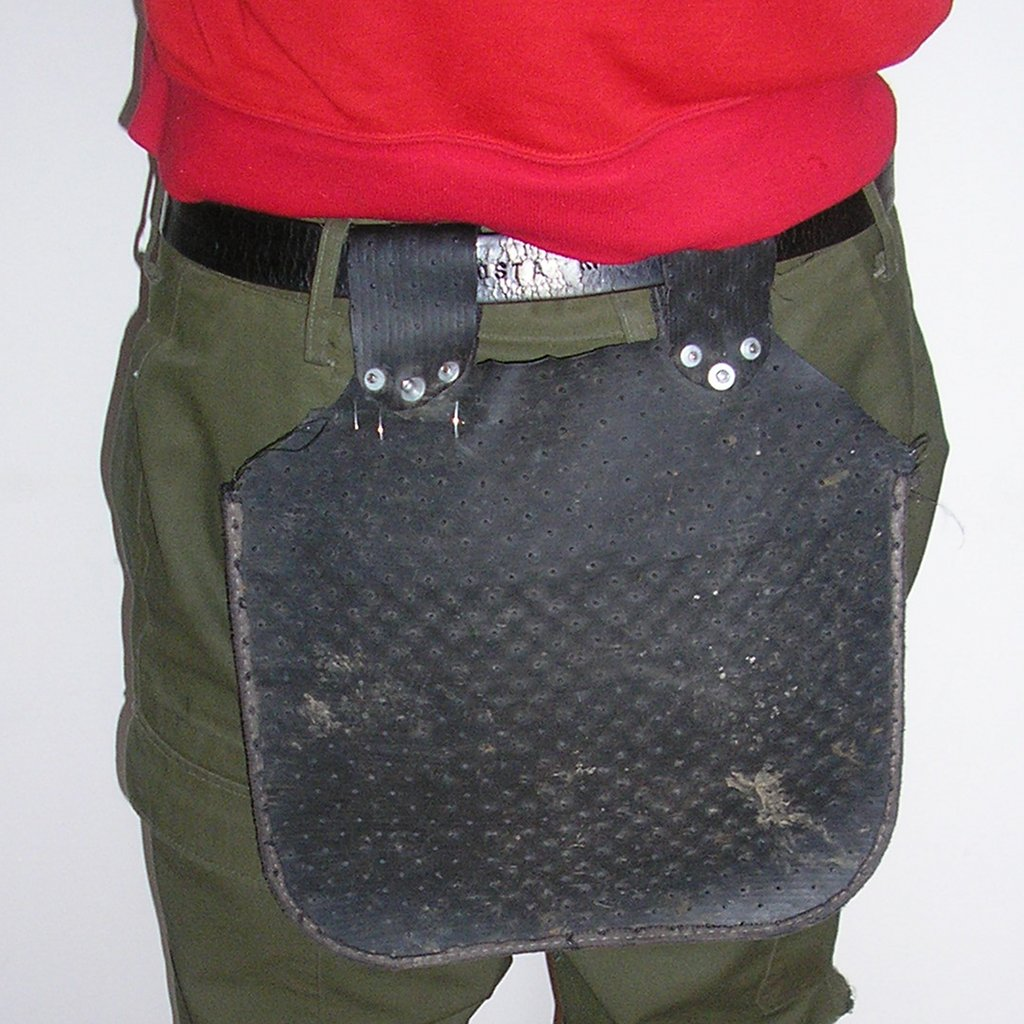
Heavy butt flap

The term bum flap or butt flap refers in one usage to the rear flap in a union suit, In this usage, it is also sometimes termed as crap flap, evacuation flap, or with some other euphemism. In another usage (train hopping), the term refers to a piece of removable material that hangs from the waist to cover a person's buttocks. The external flap is of ambiguous origin, but probably was originally intended to reduce abrasive wear to pants. Sitting or sliding on a rough surface can rapidly wear the seat of pants, and flaps act as replaceable buffer material. They also provide some protection from damp or cold surfaces. The freely swinging flap dries faster than wet pants, and can be easier to clean. Bum flaps are often worn as a superfluous fashion statement, usually emblazoned with punk iconography.

Flaps are usually constructed by hand with the most suitable material available, often canvas or denim from discarded clothing. Water resistant and thermally insulating flaps are desirable for long distance freighthopping rail travel and camping. Flaps may be stitched to clothing, or suspended from the belt.
