= Devilock =

Hairstyle

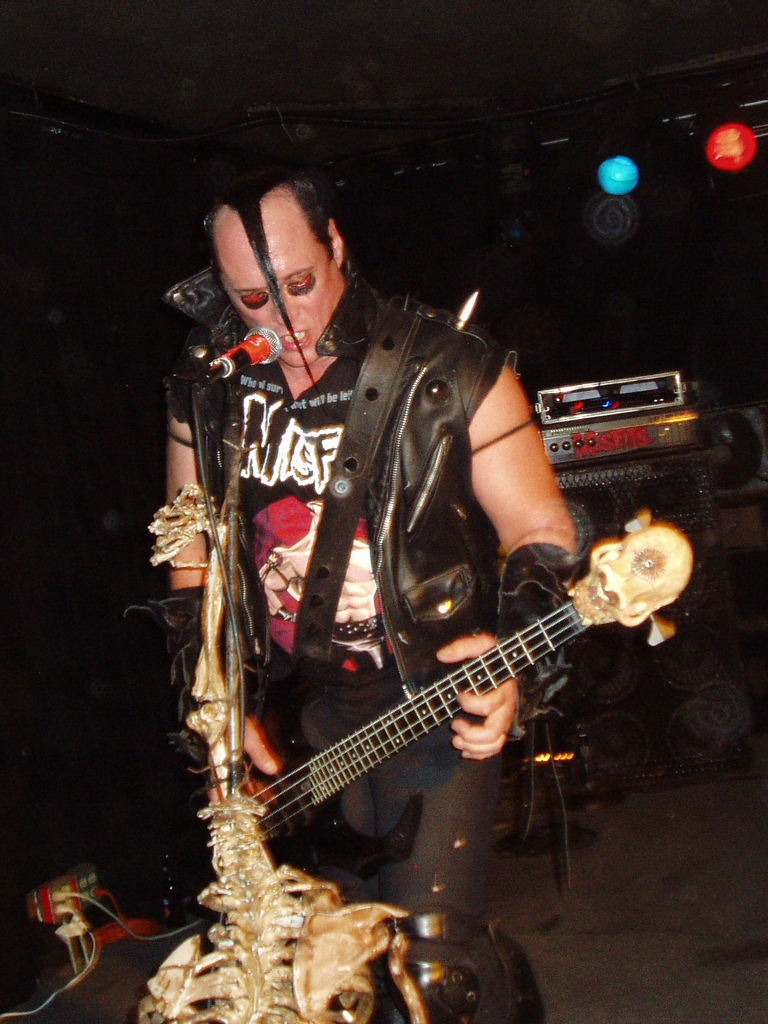
Jerry Only sporting a Devilock in concert.

The devilock is a hairstyle created by Misfits bassist Jerry Only in the late 1970s. In an early 1980s interview, Jerry Only claimed that the devilock was based on a "tidal wave" hairstyle seen among the 1970s skateboarding communities. In the same interview, former Misfits vocalist Glenn Danzig explains that his version of the hairstyle developed from an imitation of Eddie Munster's hairstyle. A style similar to the Devilock was sported earlier - for instance the elephant trunk hairstyle of the 1950s, the Surfari's cover picture of 'Gum-dipped Slicks' (1964) shows a member of the band with a devilock-like quiff, as did the guitarist from the contemporaneous Tornadoes of Bustin' Surfboards fame.

In a devilock, the sides and back of the hair are kept short, while the front is kept long and combed forward. In the late 1990s, the devilock experienced a resurgence of popularity in Asian markets that saw the hairstyle spread from punk rock to mainstream culture. Following popularization in Japanese and Chinese rock groups, the hairstyle's name was appropriated by Noriaki Endo in his chain of retail clothing stores. The "Devilock" brand currently sponsors music events called "Devilock Nights" throughout Southeast Asia.

== See also ==
- List of hairstyles
