= Index of internet-related articles =

This page provides an index of articles thought to be Internet or Web related topics.

== A ==
AARNet - Abilene Network - Access control list - Ad hoc network - Address resolution protocol - ADSL - AirPort - All your base are belong to us - AOL - APNIC - AppleTalk - Application Configuration Access Protocol - Archimedes Plutonium - Archie search engine - ARIN - ASN.1 - Asynchronous Transfer Mode - Auction - Authentication - Automatic teller machine - Autonomous system - Awards

== B ==
Yahoo! Babel Fish - Backbone cabal - Base - Bet exchange - Biefeld-Brown effect - Blank media tax - Bogon filtering - Bomb-making instructions on the internet - Book - Bookmark - Border gateway protocol - Broadband Integrated Services Digital Network - Broadband Internet - Bulletin board system

== C ==
Cable modem - Carrier-sense multiple access - Carrier-sense multiple access with collision detection - Carrier-sense multiple access with collision avoidance - CDDB - Content-control software - Chain letter - Channel access method - Charles Stark Draper Prize - Cisco - Classless Inter-Domain Routing - Code Red worm - Common Gateway Interface - Communications protocol - Component Object Model (COM) - Computer - Computer addiction - Computer-assisted language learning - computer network - Computer worm - Computing technology - Concurrent Versions System - Consumer privacy - Content-control software - Content delivery - Coordinated Universal Time - Core router - CSMA/CARP - Customer privacy - Cyber law - Cyberpunk - Cybersex - Cyberspace

== D ==
Darknet - DDP - Defense Advanced Research Projects Agency - del.icio.us - Delivermail - Demilitarized zone (computing) - Denial of service - DHCP - Dial-up - Dial-up access - DiffServ - Digital divide - Digital literacy - Digital Equipment Corporation - Digital subscriber line - DirecTV - DISH Network - Disk image - Distance-vector routing protocol - DNS - Domain forwarding - Domain name registry - DVB - Dynamic DNS

== E ==
E-card - E-democracy - E-mail - E-Services - EBay - Eldred v. Ashcroft - Electronic mailing list - Electronic money - Embrace, extend and extinguish - End-to-end connectivity - Enterprise content management - Entropy - Epoch - Ethernet - European Installation Bus - EverQuest - Everything2 - Extended ASCII - Extranet -

== F ==
Fan fiction - FAQ - Federal Standard 1037C - Fiber optic - Fidonet - File sharing - File transfer protocol - Finger protocol - Firefox - Firewall - Flaming - Floppy disk - Focus group - Form - FORscene - Frame Relay - FTP

== G ==
Gecko - Geocaching - G.hn - GIMPS - Global Internet usage - Glossary of Internet-related terminology - GNU - Gnutella - Google - Gopher protocol

== H ==
Hacker ethic - Hate sites - HDLC - Head end - Hierarchical routing - High speed internet - Hilary Rosen - History of radio - History of the Internet - Homepage - HomePNA - Hop (telecommunications) - HTML - HTTP - HTTPS - Human–computer interaction

== I ==
ICANN - ICQ - Identity theft - IEEE 802.11 - IMAP - IMAPS - Indigenous Dialogues - Infocom - Information Age - Information Awareness Office - Instant messaging - Integrated Services Digital Network - Internet - Internet access in the United States - Internet Archive - Internet as a source of prior art - Internet backbone - Internet Capitalization Conventions - Internet censorship - Internet censorship circumvention - Internet Chess Club - Internet child pornography - Internet Control Message Protocol - Internet democracy - Internet Engineering Task Force - Internet friendship - Internet Group Management Protocol - Internet minute - Internet organizations - Internet phone - Internet pornography - Internet Protocol - Internet protocol suite - Internet radio - Internet-related terminology - Internet Relay Chat - Internet romance - Internet service provider - Internet slang - Internet Society - Internet standard - Internet Storm Center - Internet time - Internet troll - Internet2 - Internetworking - InterNIC - Interpedia - Interplanetary Internet - InterWiki - Intranet - iOS - IP address - IPv4 - IPv6 - IPX - IRC - ISCSI - ISDN - ISO 8601 - ISO 8859-1

== J ==
JAIN - James H. Clark - Java applet - Java platform - JavaScript - Jon Postel - JPEG - JSTOR

== K ==
KA9Q - Knowledge Aided Retrieval in Activity Context - Ken McVay - Kerberos - KNX

== L ==
LACNIC - Large Technical System - Larry Page - Legal aspects of computing - Lightweight Directory Access Protocol - Link-state routing protocol - Linux Network Administrators' Guide - List of the oldest currently registered Internet domain names - LiveJournal - Load balancing - Local area network - Loopback - Lycos

== M ==
Mailbomb - Make money fast - Matt Drudge - Media player (application software) - Medium - Melissa worm - MenuetOS - Metcalfe's law - Metropolitan area network - Microsoft .NET - Microsoft SQL Server - Miller test - Mirror - Modem - Modulation - Morris worm - Mozilla Firefox - Mozilla Thunderbird - MPEG-1 Audio Layer II - Multichannel video programming distributor - Multicast - MUMPS - MYSPACE - MXlo -

== N ==
Napster - National Broadband Network - NetBIOS - Netiquette - Netscape Communicator - Netwar - Network address translation - Network Control Protocol - Network File System - Network Information Centre - Network mapping - Network News Transfer Protocol - Network time protocol - News agency - News aggregator - News client (newsreader) - News server - Non-repudiation - Novell - NSD - NSFNet - NTLM - Nude celebrities on the Internet

== O ==
Online - online banking - Online Books Page - Open mail relay - Open Shortest Path First - Opera (web browser) - Organizations - OS/390 - OSI model - OSPF - Out-of-band data

== P ==
Packet radio - Packet switching - Parasitic computing - Parental controls - Paul Mockapetris - Paul Vixie - PayPal - Peer-to-peer - Peering - Pen pal - Perl - Personal area network - Ping - PKZIP - Plug-and-play - Point-to-Point Protocol - Political media - POP - POP3 - Port forwarding - Port scan - Pretty Good Privacy - Primary mirror - Private IP address - Project Gutenberg - Protocol - Protocol stack - Pseudonymous remailer - PSOS (real-time operating system) - Psychological effects of Internet use - Public switched telephone network - Publishing

== Q ==
QNX - QOTD - Quality of service - QuickTime

== R ==
Red Hat - Regex - Regulation of Investigatory Powers Act 2000 - RPC - Resource Reservation Protocol - Request for Comments - Reverse Address Resolution Protocol - RIPE - RISC OS - Root nameserver - Route analytics - Router (computing) - Routing - Rooster Teeth - Routing information protocol - RSA - RTP - RTSP

== S ==
SCADA - Scientology vs. the Internet - scp - Script kiddie - Secret identity - Secure copy - Secure file transfer program - Secure shell - Sequenced packet exchange - Sergey Brin - Serial line IP - Serial Line Internet Protocol - Serial (podcast) - SMB - SFTP - Signalling System 7 - Simple Network Management Protocol - Slashdot effect - Smallband - Smiley - Simple File Transfer Protocol - SMTP - Social engineering (security) - Social impact of YouTube - Social media - Software development kit - Sohonet - Spam - SPX - Spyware - SQL slammer worm - SSH - SSH File Transfer Protocol - Stateful firewall - Stateless firewall - Steganography - Stub network

== T ==
TCP - TCP and UDP port numbers - Ted Nelson - Telecommunications - Telecommunications network - Telecommunications traffic engineering - Teledesic - Telegraphy - Teleprinter - Telnet - The Cathedral and the Bazaar - Think tank - Thunderbird - Time to live - Timeline of communication technology - Timeline of computing 1950-1979 - Timeline of computing 1980-1989 - Tiscali - Token Ring - Top-level domain - Traceroute - Transmission Control Protocol - Transmission system - Transport Layer Security - Trusted computing - TTL

== U ==
UDDI - Ubiquitous Knowledge Processing Lab - Ultrix - Ungermann-Bass - Uniform Resource Identifier - Uniform Resource Locator - Universal Plug and Play - University of California, Berkeley - Usenet - Usenet cabal - USENET Cookbook - User Datagram Protocol - UTF-16 - UUCP

== V ==
vCard - Victorian Internet - Vint Cerf - Virtual community - Voice over IP

== W ==
WAP - WAI - War driving - Warez - Warhol worm - WAV - Web 2.0 - Web annotation - Web application - Web browser - Webcomic - Web commerce - Web design - Web directory - Web hosting - Web index - Web portal - Web search engine - Web server - Web service - Web traffic - Web television - Webcam - WebDAV - Webmail - Webpage - WebQuest - Website - Whois - Wi-Fi - Wide area information server - Wide area network - Wiki software - Wikipedia - wikipediaLC- WikiWikiWeb - Windows 3.x - Winsock - Wireless access point - Wireless Application Protocol - Wireless broadband - Wireless community network - World Wide Web - WorldForge

== X ==
X.25 - XDR - Xerox Network Systems - XML - XS4ALL

== Y ==
YTMND - Yahoo! - Yahoo! Internet Life

== Z ==
Zephyr

== See also ==
- Category:Computing terminology
- List of computing topics
