= Farouk Kamoun =

Tunisian computer scientist

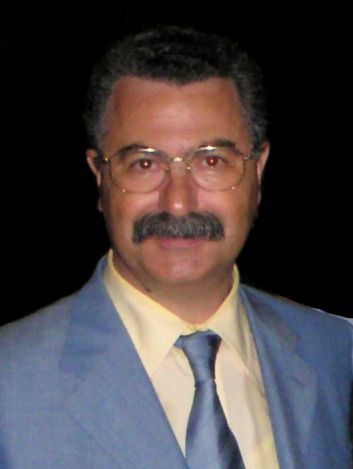
- Born: October 20, 1946 (age 79); Sfax
- Citizenship: Tunisian
- Known for: Hierarchical routing optimal number
- Scientific career
- Fields: Computer Science
- Workplaces: ENSI
- Doctoral advisor: Leonard Kleinrock

Farouk Kamoun (born October 20, 1946) is a Tunisian computer scientist and professor of computer science at the National School of Computer Sciences (ENSI) of Manouba University, Tunisia. He contributed in the late 1970s to significant research in the field of computer networking in relation with the first ARPANET network. He is also one of the pioneers of the development of the Internet in Tunisia in the early 1990s.

== Contribution to computer science ==
The contribution of Dr. Kamoun in the domain of hierarchical routing begun in 1979 with his professor at the University of California UCLA, Leonard Kleinrock. They argued that the optimal number of levels for an $N$ router subnet is $ln(N)$, requiring a total of $e\cdot ln(N)$ entries per router. They also showed that the increase in effective mean path length caused by hierarchical routing is sufficiently small that it is usually acceptable.

The research work conducted in Tunisia in the 1980s on network flow control based on buffer management is considered as the basis of the now selective reject algorithms used in the Internet.

== Education and career ==
He received a French engineering degree in 1970, a Master's and a PhD degree from the University of California at Los Angeles Computer Science Department. His PhD work, undertaken under the supervision of Dr Leonard Kleinrock, a pioneer in the area of networking, was related to the design of large computer networks. They were among the first to introduce and evaluate cluster-based hierarchical routing. Results obtained then are still very relevant and have recently inspired considerable work in the area of ad hoc networking.

He returned to Tunisia in 1976 and was given the task to create and chair the first Computer Science School of the country (ENSI). From 1982 to 1993, he chaired the CNI, Centre National de l'Informatique, a Government Office in charge of IT policies and strategic development.

He promoted the field of networking in Tunisia through the organization of several national conferences and workshops dealing with networks. As chairman of CNI, he represented Tunisia at the general assembly and executive board meetings of the Intergovernmental Bureau for Informatics (IBI) in Rome, in the '80s, as well as those of the UNESCO IT Intergovernmental Committee, with a focus on issues related to developing countries.

From 1993 till 1999, he served as Dean of ENSI, Ecole Nationale des Sciences de l'Informatique, a School of Engineering dedicated to the training of computer engineers. Since 1999, he continues to teach and serve as director of the CRISTAL Research Laboratory of the ENSI. He is also an advisor in IT fields to the Tunisian minister of Higher Education, Scientific Research and Technology.
