= Route flapping =

Alternating route advertisements

In computer networking and telecommunications, route flapping occurs when a router alternately advertises a destination network via one route then another, or as unavailable and then available again, in quick sequence.

== Condition ==
Route flapping is caused by pathological conditions (hardware errors, software errors, configuration errors, intermittent errors in communications links, unreliable connections, etc.) within the network which cause certain reachability information to be repeatedly advertised and withdrawn. For example, link flap occurs when an interface on a router has a hardware failure that causes the router to announce it alternately as up and down.

In networks with link-state routing protocols, route flapping will force frequent recalculation of the topology by all participating routers. In networks with distance-vector routing protocols, route flapping can trigger routing updates with every state change. In both cases, it prevents the network from converging.

Route flapping can be contained to a smaller area of the network if route aggregation is used. As an aggregate route will not be withdrawn as long as at least one of the aggregated subnets is still valid, a flapping route that is part of an aggregate will not disturb the routers that receive the aggregate.

== See also ==
- BGP route damping
- Supernet
