= HSR =

HSR may refer to:

== Arts and media ==
- Historical Social Research, a quarterly journal
- Honkai: Star Rail, a 2023 gacha video game

== Biology and medicine ==
- Health services research
- Heat shock response, via HSPA1A gene
- Homogeneously staining region

== Computing ==
- Hidden surface removal
- Hierarchical state routing
- High-availability Seamless Redundancy

== Places ==
- Haliburton Scout Reserve, a Scouts Canada camp
- Hochschule für Technik Rapperswil, a university in St. Gallen, Switzerland
- HSR Layout, a suburb of Bangalore, India

== Transport ==
- Hamilton Street Railway, a transit agency in Ontario, Canada
- High-speed rail
  - Higher-speed rail
- High-Speed Research Program, a 1990–1999 NASA supersonic jet program
- Hisar Junction railway station, in Haryana, India
- Historic Sportscar Racing, an American historic motorsport series
- Holyoke Street Railway, a former transit system in western Massachusetts
- Hot Springs Municipal Airport, South Dakota, US
- Mitsubishi HSR, a concept car

== Other uses ==
- Hart–Scott–Rodino Antitrust Improvements Act, a 1976 US federal law
