= Lin Cai =

Chinese-Canadian telecommunications engineer

Lin Cai is a Chinese-Canadian telecommunications engineer known for her work on topology control in wireless networks and in the applications of wireless communications to self-driving cars. She was educated at the University of Waterloo and is a professor of electrical and computer engineering at the University of Victoria.

Cai should be distinguished from her coauthor Lin X. Cai of the Illinois Institute of Technology, also a wireless networking engineer, also a student of the same advisor at the University of Waterloo, and also an IEEE Fellow.

== Education and career ==
Cai has a bachelor's degree from the Nanjing University of Science and Technology. She completed her Ph.D. at the University of Waterloo in 2005, under the supervision of Xuemin (Sherman) Shen, and in the same year joined the University of Victoria faculty.

== Recognition ==
Cai became an E. W. R. Steacie Memorial Fellow of the Canadian Natural Sciences and Engineering Research Council in 2019. She was named an IEEE Fellow in 2020, affiliated with the IEEE Vehicular Technology Society, "for contributions to topology control of wireless networks". She was elected to the College of New Scholars of the Royal Society of Canada in 2020, and is a fellow of the Canadian Academy of Engineering.
