= Poisoning (disambiguation) =

Poisoning is the action of poison.

Poisoning may also refer to:

- Biological toxicity
  - Toxin
  - Envenomation, when an animal injects its venom through a bite or sting
  - Secondary poisoning
- Radiation poisoning, a biology concept
- Catalyst poisoning, a chemistry concept
- Neutron poison, a nuclear physics concept
- Route poisoning, a computer network concept
