= WRP =

WRP may refer to:

== Computing ==
- Wireless Routing Protocol, a decentralized method for computer communication
- Windows Resource Protection, a feature in some Windows operating systems

== Political parties ==
- Wessex Regionalist Party, a minor political party in the United Kingdom
- Wildrose Party, a defunct political party in Alberta, Canada
- Workers' Revolutionary Party (disambiguation), various political parties

== Government programs ==
- Witness relocation program, a US federal program for protecting witnesses
- Wetlands Reserve Program, a voluntary US federal program

== Other ==
- Waterloo Regional Police, Ontario, Canada
- Warwick Parkway railway station in England
- Wrestling Retribution Project, a TV program in the USA
- Whitehead Research Project, a group focused on Alfred North Whitehead
- Water reclamation plant, a type of facility used to treat wastewater
- White Rabbit Project (TV series), a cancelled Netflix show
- The Wind Repertory Project, an online database of wind music
