= TRILL =

Combined bridging and routing protocol

TRILL (Transparent Interconnection of Lots of Links) is a networking protocol for optimizing bandwidth and resilience in Ethernet networks, implemented by devices called TRILL switches. TRILL combines techniques from bridging and routing, and is the application of link-state routing to the VLAN-aware customer-bridging problem. Routing bridges (RBridges) are compatible with, and can incrementally replace, previous IEEE 802.1 customer bridges. TRILL Switches are also compatible with IPv4 and IPv6, routers and end systems. They are invisible to current IP routers, and like conventional routers, RBridges terminate the broadcast, unknown-unicast and multicast traffic of DIX Ethernet and the frames of IEEE 802.2 LLC including the bridge protocol data units of the Spanning Tree Protocol.

TRILL was designed as a successor to the Spanning Tree Protocol, both having been created by the same person, Radia Perlman. The catalyst for TRILL was an event at Beth Israel Deaconess Medical Center which began on 13 November 2002. The concept of Rbridges [sic] was first proposed to the Institute of Electrical and Electronics Engineers in 2004, who in 2005 rejected what came to be known as TRILL, and in 2006 through 2012 devised an incompatible variation known as Shortest Path Bridging.

== General overview ==
TRILL switches, or RBridges, run the IS-IS link-state routing protocol amongst themselves. In this protocol, connectivity is broadcast to all the RBridges, so that each RBridge knows about all the other RBridges, and the connectivity between them. This gives RBridges enough information to compute pair-wise optimal paths for unicast, and calculate distribution trees for delivery of frames either to destinations whose location is unknown or to multicast or broadcast groups. In contrast to Spanning Tree Protocol, which ensures a loop-free network topology by blocking otherwise active ports, TRILL establishes paths over all active links.

IS-IS was chosen because:

- it runs directly over layer 2, so it can be run without configuration [no IP addresses need be assigned], as it is inclusive of a subset of the Connectionless-mode Network Service (CLNP).
- it is easy to extend by defining new type–length–value (TLV) data elements and sub-elements for carrying TRILL information.

To mitigate temporary loop issues, RBridges forward based on a header with a hop count. RBridges also specify the next-hop RBridge as the frame destination when forwarding unicast frames across a shared-media link, which avoids spawning additional copies of frames during a temporary loop. A reverse-path forwarding check and other checks are performed on multi-destination frames to further control potentially looping traffic.

The first RBridge that a unicast frame encounters in a campus, RB1, encapsulates the received frame with a TRILL header that specifies the last RBridge, RB2, where the frame is decapsulated. RB1 is known as the "ingress RBridge" and RB2 is known as the "egress RBridge". To save room in the TRILL header and simplify forwarding lookups, a dynamic nickname acquisition protocol is run among the RBridges to select two-octet nicknames for RBridges, unique within the campus, which are an abbreviation for the six-octet IS-IS system ID of the RBridge. The two-octet nicknames are used to specify the ingress and egress RBridges in the TRILL header.

The TRILL header consists of six octets: the first two octets include a six-bit decrementing hop count, plus flags; the next two octets contain the egress RBridge nickname; the final two octets contain the ingress RBridge nickname. For multi-destination frames, the "egress RBridge nickname" specifies a distribution tree for the frame, where the (nick)named RBridge is the root of the distribution tree. The ingress RBridge selects which distribution tree the frame should travel along.

Even though RBridges are transparent to Layer 3 devices, and all the links interconnected by RBridges appear to Layer 3 devices to be a single link, RBridges act as link routers in the sense that, in the forwarding of a frame by a transit RBridge, the outer Layer 2 header is replaced at each hop with an appropriate Layer 2 header for the next hop, and the hop count is decreased. Despite these modifications of the outer Layer 2 header and the hop count in the TRILL Header, the original encapsulated frame is preserved, including the original frame's VLAN tag.

Multipathing of multi-destination frames through alternative distribution tree roots and equal-cost multi-path routing (ECMP) of unicast frames are supported. Networks with a more mesh-like structure benefit to a greater extent from the multipathing and optimal paths provided by TRILL than networks with a more tree-like structure.

A host with multiple interfaces running the Internet Protocol requires that each of the interfaces [or the group of interfaces in a team] have a unique address, whereas when using TRILL the multiple-interface host can have a single IP address for all of its interfaces attached to a common broadcast domain — akin to the case of a network service access point address (NSAP) on an end system in CLNP.

== TRILL links ==
From the point of view of TRILL, a link can be any of a wide variety of link technologies, including IEEE 802.3 (Ethernet), PPP (Point to Point Protocol)., or a Pseudo-wire. Ethernet links between RBridges can incorporate IEEE customer or provider 802.1 bridges. In other words, an arbitrary bridged LAN appears to an RBridge as a multi-access link.

It is essential that only one RBridge act as the ingress RBridge for any given native frame and TRILL has an Appointed Forwarder mechanism to assure this. TRILL does allow load splitting of this duty on a link based on VLAN, so that only one RBridge on each link encapsulates and decapsulates native frames for each VLAN.

== RBridge ports ==
RBridge ports can compatibly implement a wide variety of existing and proposed link level and IEEE 802.1 port level protocols including PAUSE (IEEE 802.3 Annex 31B), the Link Layer Discovery Protocol (IEEE 802.1AB), link aggregation (IEEE 802.1AX), MAC security (IEEE 802.1AE), or port based access control (IEEE 802.1X). This is because RBridges are layered above the IEEE 802.1 EISS (Extended Internal Sublayer Service) with the exception that an RBridge port handles spanning tree and VLAN registration PDUs differently.

== Open source implementations ==
- Accton IgniteNet MeshLinq – based on Quagga 0.99.22.4
- Gandi's quagga with TRILL – based on Quagga 0.99.22.4
- MichaelQQ's Quagga-PE featuring TRILL and MPLS – based on Quagga 0.99.22.4

== Proprietary implementations ==
Cisco FabricPath is a proprietary implementation of TRILL that utilizes the TRILL control plane (including IS-IS for Layer 2), but a non-interoperable data plane. Brocade Virtual Cluster Switching, uses the TRILL data plane but a proprietary control plane and so is not interoperable with standards conformant TRILL.

== VLAN support ==
The TRILL protocol provides mandatory support for the usual 4K VLANs and can optionally support 24-bit Fine Grain Labels (FGL) in addition to VLANs.

== Competitors ==
During its development, the IEEE 802.1aq standard (Shortest Path Bridging – SPB) was considered the major competitor of TRILL. As one 2011 book noted, "the evaluation of relative merits and difference of the two standards proposals is currently a hotly debated topic in the networking industry." Neither standard has seen significant adoption, in contrast to more recent overlay approaches such as EVPN.

== Product support ==
- Shanghai Baud Data Communication S5800 and S9500
- Zhejiang Dahua Technology DH-S7602 and DH-S7606
- Extreme Networks BD-X series, Summit X670 series and Summit X770 series
- HPE FlexFabric 5700, 9540 and 12900E
- Huawei CloudEngine 5800, 6860, 8800 and 12800
- IgniteNet MeshLinq ML-S-4GE-1MGE
- New H3C Technologies S6800, S6860, S10500 and S10500X
- Ruijie Networks RG-S6220, RG-S12000 and RG-N18000
- Shenzhen Youhua Technology YH-S5800 and YH-S9500
- ZTE Corporation ZXR10 5960 and ZXR10 9900(-S)
