= Lin X. Cai =

Telecommunications engineer

Lin X. Cai is a telecommunications engineer whose research interests include energy harvesting as a way of powering wireless sensor networks for the internet of things. Educated in Canada, she works in the US as a professor of electrical and computer engineering at the Illinois Institute of Technology.

Cai studied electrical and computer engineering at the University of Waterloo, receiving a master's degree in 2005 and a Ph.D. in 2010. After completing her doctorate, under the supervision of Xuemin (Sherman) Shen, she continued to work with Shen as an NSERC Postdoctoral Fellow. She was named to the 2026 class of IEEE Fellows "for contributions to sustainable wireless communication and networking".

She should be distinguished from her coauthor Lin Cai of the University of Victoria, also a telecommunications engineer, student of Shen at Waterloo, and IEEE Fellow.
