= Nomadix =

Networking hardware company

Nomadix, Inc.
- Type: Private
- Founded: 1998; 28 years ago in Santa Monica, California, United States
- Founders: Leonard Kleinrock; Joel Short
- Headquarters: Woodland Hills, California, United States
- Products: Network gateway equipment, including access gateways, TV Casting, Cloud PBX and mobile app Nomadix Service Engine (NSE) software
- Parent: Assa Abloy
- Website: nomadix.com

Nomadix, Inc. is an American developer of network gateway equipment used by hotels and other businesses to deliver Internet access to end users. Based in Woodland Hills, California, the company has been part of Assa Abloy since its acquisition in 2024.

== History ==
Nomadix sells through distributors to hospitality businesses with guest and visitor networks, such as the SLS hotel in Beverly Hills, businesses operating guest Wi-Fi networks, such as the Chicago Mercantile Exchange, event management companies hosting large crowds, such as the 2014 World Cup, apartment complexes and public spaces.

Nomadix was founded in 1998 by UCLA Computer Science Professor Dr. Leonard Kleinrock, one of the founders of ARPANET, and a graduate student, Joel Short. The name Nomadix came from Kleinrock's studies of nomadic computing. Kleinrock served as the company's first CEO and chairman, and Short served as Chief Technology Officer.

The company's first product, the Nomadix Universal Subscriber Gateway, shipped in September 1999. The gateway was designed to allow visiting computers to connect to the Internet, without needing extra equipment or software on the computer. Built-in payment gateway features managed optional billing and payment functions.

In February 2002, Nomadix announced a technology licensing deal for their Nomadix Service Engine (NSE) software with Agere Systems, now part of Avago Technologies, and at the time the second largest Wi-Fi vendor behind Cisco Systems.

In March 2002, the company announced a customized version of its Universal Subscriber Gateway (USG), designed in a partnership with wireless networking company Boingo Wireless, to allow businesses to set up commercial Wi-Fi hot spots.

In January 2004, the company was awarded the industry's first patent for redirecting a customer's computer to a sign-in page, also known as a "gateway" page.

In June 2012, Nomadix launched the AG 5800 access gateway, designed for large venues.

In March 2016, Nomadix announced an exclusive partnership to offer technology from WAN optimization vendor Exinda to the hospitality industry.

Swedish conglomerate Assa Abloy acquired Nomadix in March 2024.

== Acquisitions & sales ==
In December 2006, Nomadix was acquired by Singapore-based MagiNet, a provider of wireless hospitality solutions in the Asia pacific region. The company was to continue operating under the Nomadix name.

In December 2007, it was announced that MagiNet was acquired by DOCOMO interTouch Pte. Ltd, a subsidiary of Japan's NTT DOCOMO, for $150M.

== Lawsuits ==
In July 2004, Nomadix was sued by Carlsbad, CA-based IP3 Networks, a wireless networking competitor, for trade libel, for allegedly telling customers that IP3 was stealing its technology. In February 2006, the case was dismissed.

In March 2007, Nomadix sued competitor Second Rule, which by then had acquired IP3's NetAccess gateway, for infringing on five of Nomadix's patents.

In March 2009, a judge awarded Nomadix a $3.2M judgment in the Second Rule case, and granted a permanent injunction.

In November 2009, the company filed patent infringement lawsuits against eight companies, including Hewlett Packard, Wayport, Inc., iBAHN, LodgeNet and Aruba Networks, seeking damages and injunctions over the use of eight of its patents.

In November 2012, Hewlett Packard became the third and largest of the eight defendants in the 2009 patent lawsuit to settle, agreeing to pay licensing fees to continue to use Nomadix' patented technology. In March 2013, AT&T, now owner of Wayport and Superclick, another defendant, settled and agreed to pay licensing fees. In September 2013, Aruba Networks also settled and also agreed to pay licensing fees. In October 2014, Nomadix sued Norcross, Georgia-based Blueprint RF for patent infringement of its captive portal technology, based on U.S. Patent No. 8,156,246.

In February 2016, the U.S. District Court upheld Nomadix' patent claim against Blueprint RF.
