= Routing bridge =

A routing bridge or RBridge, also known as a TRILL switch, is a network device that implements the TRILL protocol and should not be confused with BRouters (Bridging Routers). RBridges are compatible with previous IEEE 802.1 customer bridges as well as IPv4 and IPv6 routers and end nodes. They are invisible to current IP routers and, like routers, RBridges terminate the bridge spanning tree protocol.

The RBridges in a campus share connectivity information amongst themselves using the IS-IS link-state protocol. A link-state protocol is one in which connectivity is broadcast to all the RBridges, so that each RBridge knows about all the other RBridges, and the connectivity between them. This gives RBridges enough information to compute pair-wise optimal paths for unicast, and calculate distribution trees for delivery of frames either to destinations whose location is unknown or to multicast or broadcast groups. IS-IS was chosen as for this purpose because:

- it runs directly over Layer 2, so it can be run without configuration (no IP addresses need to be assigned)
- it is easy to extend by defining new TLV (type-length-value) data elements and sub-elements for carrying TRILL information.

To mitigate temporary loop issues, RBridges forward based on a header with a hop count. RBridges also specify the next hop RBridge as the frame destination when forwarding unicast frames across a shared-media link, which avoids spawning additional copies of frames during a temporary loop. A Reverse Path Forwarding Check and other checks are performed on multi-destination frames to further control potentially looping traffic.
