= Intergovernmental Bureau for Informatics =

International Information Technology organisation (1964-1988)

The Intergovernmental Bureau for Informatics (IBI) originated as a transformation of the International Computation Centre (ICC) that was created by UNESCO in 1951 by Resolution 2.24 of the General Conference, implementing the mandate of Resolutions 22(III) of October 3, 1946, 160(VII) of August 10, 1948, 318(XI) of August 14, 1950 and 394(XIII) of the UN's ECOSOC.

Due to delays in ratifications by member countries, the ICC was actually created in 1961 and became fully operational in 1964. The IBI ceased to exist in 1988. IBI Headquarters was located at 23, viale Civilità del Lavoro, 00144 Rome, Italy.

== History ==
The ICC's objective was to implement a Computation Centre that would serve the international scientific community. This was at a time when it was thought that only a few computation machines would become available and moreover they were very costly. The IBI started its activities in 1961 and it was soon overwhelmed by the speed of technological developments to the point that in 1969 it was about to become defunct due to a lack of content. Given this situation the transformation of the IBI was started. This transformation was directed by its Argentinean General Manager at the time, Fermin A. Bernasconi, and was completed in 1971.

== Member countries ==
IBI membership peaked in 1985 with 43 member countries, of which three were developed countries, France, Italy and Spain and also its largest contributors. The rest were developing or underdeveloped countries. In 1985, France withdrew its membership from IBI and by the end of 1986 Spain also withdrew. This was the start of a crisis within the IBI which led to the dissolution of this organisation in 1969. The archives of the IBI were deposited at the UNESCO. The member countries of the IBI at the time when it had the most members were the following: Algeria, Argentina, Benin, Bolivia, Brazil, Burkina Faso (formerly the Republic of Upper Volta), Cameroon, Colombia, Congo, Costa Rica, Cuba, Chile, Ecuador, Egypt, France, Gabon, Ghana, Guinea, Haiti, Iraq, Italy, Ivory Coast, Jordan, Lebanon, Liberia, Madagascar, Mali, Morocco, Mexico, Nicaragua, Niger, Nigeria, Panama, São Tomé and Príncipe, Senegal, Spain, Syria, Swaziland, Togo, Tunisia, United Arab Emirates, Venezuela, Zaire.

== Objectives ==
IBI-ICC was the only inter-governmental organization whose objective was to assist its member countries, in a permanent way, in the area of Information Technology. Its aim was to help them to better understand the impact of technology on society and to take the best advantage of these opportunities. IBI collaborated and helped its member countries to formulate strategies and policies to develop this area.

With these objectives, the ICC organized the first International symposium on Economics of Automatic Data Processing in October 1965, held in Amsterdam, (The Netherlands). IBI-ICC organized a second international symposium in 1974, on the Economics of Informatics held in Mainz, (Germany) in September. In October 1972 IBI-ICC organized the first World Conference on Informatics in Government in Florence, (Italy).

== Conferences and Symposiums ==
From 1975 onward IBI-ICC intensified its activities in the area of the development of governmental policies and strategies for informatics. The objectives of IBI-ICC was, therefore, to help member countries to establish policies for the development of Informatics in their societies. In November 1975 it organized an international symposium on "National Planning for Informatics in Developing Countries" in Baghdad (Iraq). Some 500 participants from 53 countries attended.

From 1976 onward IBI-ICC organized a series of workshops on the study of policies and strategies in informatics that were held in Punta Ala and in Venice, (Italy). These workshops ended with the Strategies and Policies International Conference (SPIN) in Informatics. The SPIN Conference was organized by the IBI-ICC and the UNESCO with the support of the Spanish Government and took place in September 1978 in Torremolinos, (Spain) with the participation of 86 countries, among them the "big powers", the US and the USSR.

Other issues addressed by the IBI-ICC related to trans-border data flows especially of the protection of personal information. To this end the first International Conference on Transborder Data Flows was organized in Rome (Italy) in September 1980 followed by a second held in 1984, also in Rome (Italy). Both conferences saw a large participation from countries and experts.

Within this context of Policies and Strategies for Informatics, the IBI-ICC also organized regional conferences. In Latin-America it organized the Latin-American Conferences for Information Managers (CALAI) held in Argentina (1970), in Mexico (1972), in Argentina (1979), in Mexico (1980), in Chile (1981), in Brazil (1982), in Uruguay (1983), in Mexico (1984), in Argentina (1985 and 1987). Subsequently, these conferences were pt on by other organizations.

In Africa IBI-ICC organized the first African Conference on Informatics in Abidjan (Ivory Coast) in 1979, followed by a second held in Dakar (Senegal) in 1983. IBI-ICC also sponsored the first SEARCC Conference held in Singapore in 1976.

== Informatics training ==
IBI-ICC was also very interested in the training in informatics. It created several regional centres for training in informatics. The CREI (the Regional Centre for the Teaching of Informatics) was opened in Madrid (Spain) in 1976, in collaboration with the Spanish Government and its activities continued until 1997. The CREALC was set up in the Federal District of Mexico in 1981 and another centre in Dakar (Senegal) in 1983. IBI-ICC also had a large fellowship program for training of students from developing member countries in developed countries. In 1983, IBI-ICC, with the Argentinean government, created a foundation in Argentina for starting what would be later called the ESLAI (Latin-American school for informatics), providing it with initial funding.

== Other activities ==
Within Latin America IBI-ICC organized two major events in 1984. in April it participated in the Round Table on "Informatics: a means of development or dependence for Latin America" put on by X CALAI-Panel 84 in Viña del mar (Chile). The proceedings were later published by IBI-ICC. In May 1984, in collaboration with the government of President Belisario Betancourt of Colombia, IBI-ICC organized "Informatics and Soveignty", strategies for regional integration, held in Cali (Colombia) from the 10th to the 12th and which gave birth to the formation of the Cali Club. The final report was also published by IBI-ICC.

The IBI also dealt with other areas of informatics and its applications to the industrial sector, for which it created a research centre in Valencia (Spain) together with the Spanish government, the IBIDI.

Additionally it organized international symposiums to examine the relationship between informatics and the press in the "Presinfo" symposium held in Valencia (Spain) in October 1984 and the "Sisyphus" symposium also held in Valencia (Spain) in May 1986 which dealt with the change from the Industrial to the Information Society.

The IBI promoted technical assistance for cooperation with its member countries by sending experts to develop national informatics plans as was done in Chile in 1976 or Iraq in 1977 and for the drafting of contracts for the public procurement of equipment and computer services as in Iraq and Tunisia.

In the mid 70s the IBI encouraged the development of Informatics Laws, publishing many studies on the relationship between law and informatics in various sectors of the society. Moreover it participated in and collaborated on conferences on this subject.

In the early 80s the IBI-ICC collaborated on efforts to standardize the use of the Arabic language in informatics. In order to achieve this it organized and financed a committee, the COARIN, for the adaptation of Arabic written characters to the ASCII code which, at that time, proved very difficult.

== Publications ==
The International Computational Centre published a Bulletin from 1962 to 1969.

Among other publications put out by the IBI is the AGORA magazine published between 1981 and 1986 with 15 editions dedicated to subjects on informatics in a changing world.

== Dissolution of IBI ==
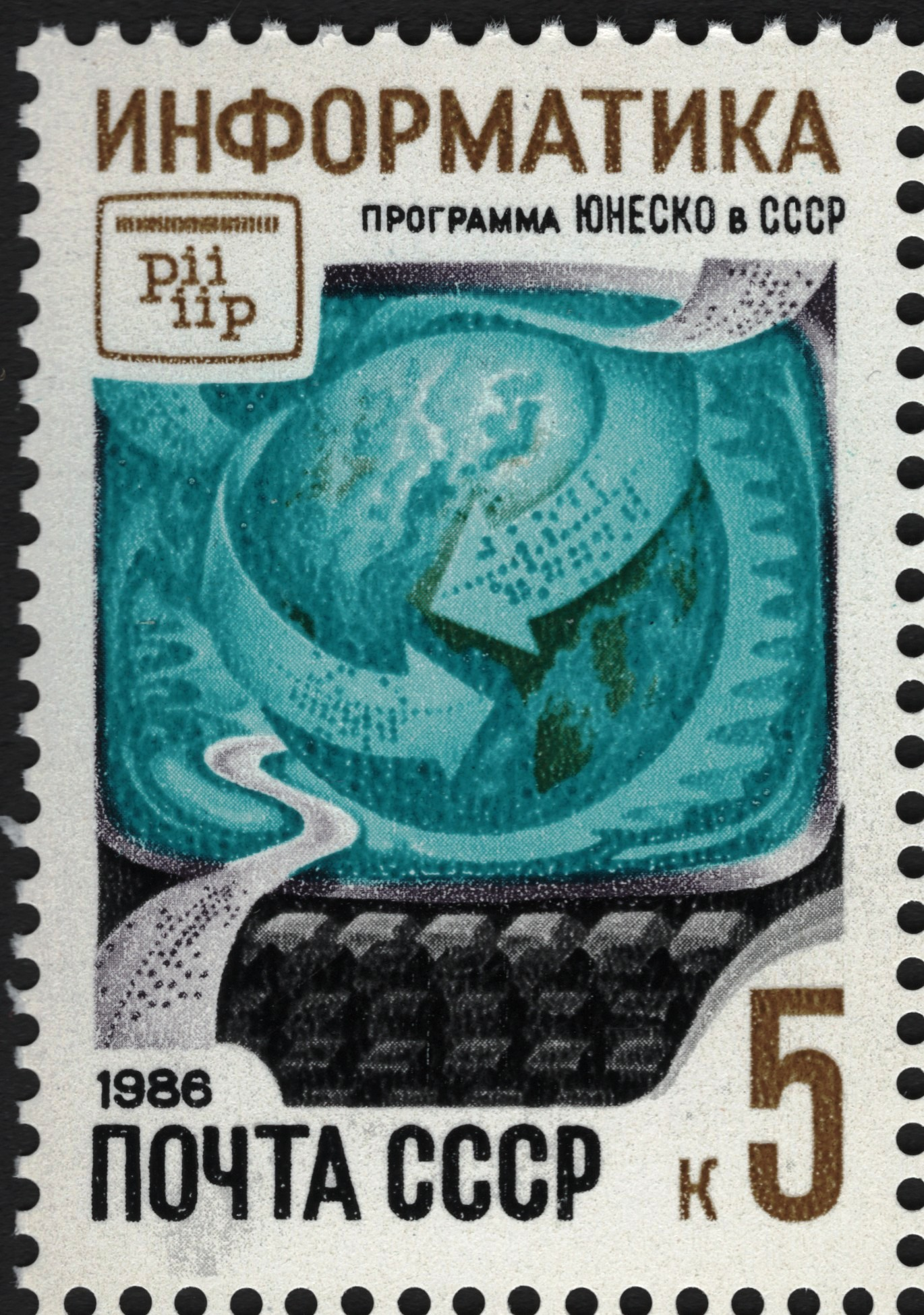
IIP on USSR postage stamp

The demise of IBI was proximally caused by the loss of funding as several countries withdrew from the organization. In 1984, persisting divergences between the IBI leadership and UNESCO, about the politics and character of the field, resulted in the decision by UNESCO to create a separate [Intergovernmental Informatics Programme] (IIP), which was launched in 1986. Besides being more attuned to the interests of computer manufacturing countries, this new entity was financed by UNESCO's regular budget, whereas IBI required separate contribution from member countries. France was the first to switch from IBI to the just-created IIP (then headed by French scientist [André Danzin]). In the next three years, several other countries followed suit, including Spain and Italy. In addition, several developing countries failed to pay their dues.

The financial situation having become untenable, the IBI decided to ends its activities in its 4th extraordinary session in 1987, and nominated a Liquidation Committee for that purpose. Two other extraordinary sessions took place in 1988, the 5th on April 28–29 and the 6th on November 28–29.

At the time of its closure, the IBI had 108 employees and debts of US$20 million. UNESCO refused to assume these debts or incorporate IBI's programmes. Instead it took over only those of IBI's responsibilities which were not already included in the IIP.

The IBI was the only international body to disappear from the League of Nations. It has been claimed that the closure was largely due to pressure from the U.S. government, who would have put pressure on the governments of Spain and Italy. By these claims, the U.S. blamed ISI for the fall in equipment sales to developing countries, and were displeased by IBI's projects in Nicaragua and Cuba, for which the U.S. government threatened commercial reprisals in Brazil between 1986 and 1988.
