= Web Index =

Statistical ranking of the web's contribution to social, economic and political progress

Map showing the score of countries as listed in 2014

The Web Index was a composite statistic designed and produced by the World Wide Web Foundation as a pilot project over a three year period. It was the first multi-dimensional measure of the World Wide Web's contribution to development and human rights globally. It covered 86 countries from 2012-2014, with an announcement in November 2015 that the index had finished being compiled. It incorporated indicators that assess the areas of universal access, freedom and openness, relevant content, and empowerment, which indicate economic, social, and political effects of the Web.

== Web Index scores ==
2014
Rank	Country	Web Index
1	Denmark	100.0
2	Finland	98.81
3	Norway	97.32
4	United Kingdom	95.67
5	Sweden	94.97
6	United States	94.52
7	Iceland	93.72
8	South Korea	92.81
9	Netherlands	91.84
10	Belgium	89.61
11	France	89.09
12	New Zealand	87.48
13	Australia	87.27
14	Germany	86.19
15	Austria	86.00
16	Canada	85.59
17	Estonia	85.05
18	Switzerland	84.73
19	Japan	79.00
20	Ireland	78.28
21	Israel	75.46
22	Singapore	75.16
23	Spain	74.53
24	Chile	74.18
25	Portugal	73.33
26	Hungary	66.12
27	Uruguay	66.10
28	Czech Republic	65.50
29	Italy	63.83
30	Greece	60.91
31	Argentina	60.74
32	Costa Rica	60.38
33	Brazil	60.19
34	Poland	58.81
35	Russia	58.17
36	Colombia	57.12
37	Mexico	55.34
38	Turkey	53.30
39	Tunisia	51.93
40	Mauritius	49.60
41	Philippines	48.87
42	Malaysia	48.34
43	Peru	46.62
44	China	45.97
45	South Africa	45.82
46	Ukraine	45.20
47	United Arab Emirates	44.90
48	India	44.60
49	Jamaica	44.50
50	Ecuador	42.57
51	Morocco	40.28
52	Indonesia	39.37
53	Thailand	39.20
54	Qatar	38.01
55	Kenya	37.48
56	Bahrain	36.41
57	Kazakhstan	35.65
58	Ghana	29.87
59	Venezuela	29.79
60	Egypt	28.98
61	Botswana	28.44
62	Nigeria	28.09
63	Bangladesh	28.00
64	Saudi Arabia	27.72
65	Jordan	27.43
66	Namibia	25.97
67	Vietnam	24.89
68	Uganda	24.62
69	Nepal	23.95
70	Rwanda	23.34
71	Zambia	22.75
72	Senegal	21.67
73	Tanzania	21.33
74	Malawi	18.87
75	Zimbabwe	18.43
76	Pakistan	17.76
77	Benin	15.75
78	Mozambique	15.46
79	Burkina Faso	13.72
80	Sierra Leone	13.44
81	Haiti	12.52
82	Mali	11.14
83	Cameroon	9.71
84	Yemen	5.17
85	Myanmar	3.03
86	Ethiopia	0.0

2013
Rank	Country	Web Index
1	Sweden	100.0
2	Norway	97.5
3	United Kingdom	95.6
4	United States	95.2
5	New Zealand	92.4
6	Denmark	92.4
7	Finland	91.9
8	Iceland	91.9
9	France	90.9
10	South Korea	87.4
11	Australia	86.4
12	Netherlands	86.4
13	Germany	86.4
14	Austria	84.8
15	Canada	84.3
16	Japan	83.1
17	Switzerland	79.3
18	Estonia	77.3
19	Ireland	76.0
20	Belgium	75.2
21	Poland	74.2
22	Italy	74.1
23	Portugal	72.8
24	Czech Republic	72.5
25	Israel	72.3
26	Greece	70.8
27	Chile	68.9
28	Spain	66.8
29	Uruguay	62.0
30	Mexico	61.6
31	Singapore	60.7
32	Colombia	60.1
33	Brazil	58.7
34	Costa Rica	57.2
35	South Africa	55.8
36	Argentina	55.2
37	Malaysia	53.2
38	Philippines	48.2
39	Peru	48.1
40	Mauritius	47.8
41	Russia	47.1
42	Hungary	46.3
43	Ecuador	43.9
44	Tunisia	43.6
45	United Arab Emirates	42.7
46	Thailand	41.5
47	Jamaica	40.0
48	Indonesia	39.7
49	Kazakhstan	38.5
50	Bahrain	38.4
51	Qatar	38.0
52	Venezuela	37.7
53	Kenya	36.8
54	Morocco	34.4
55	Ghana	32.7
56	India	32.4
57	China	31.1
58	Turkey	30.9
59	Tanzania	30.6
60	Namibia	30.2
61	Senegal	28.4
62	Jordan	27.1
63	Egypt	24.5
64	Bangladesh	24.4
65	Uganda	20.8
66	Zambia	20.4
67	Nigeria	20.2
68	Botswana	17.4
69	Saudi Arabia	16.5
70	Benin	16.1
71	Nepal	14.7
72	Vietnam	13.8
73	Burkina Faso	13.6
74	Malawi	12.2
75	Rwanda	12.0
76	Cameroon	10.6
77	Pakistan	10.4
78	Zimbabwe	10.1
79	Mali	7.7
80	Ethiopia	1.8
81	Yemen	0.0

2012
Rank	Country	Web Index
1	Sweden	100.00
2	United States	97.31
3	United Kingdom	93.83
4	Canada	93.42
5	Finland	91.88
6	Switzerland	90.49
7	New Zealand	89.15
8	Australia	88.44
9	Norway	87.76
10	Ireland	87.42
11	Singapore	86.14
12	Iceland	86.10
13	South Korea	81.06
14	France	78.93
16	Israel	78.53
17	Brazil	74.94
18	Germany	74.87
19	Portugal	72.33
20	Spain	72.12
21	Chile	69.55
25	Poland	54.84
26	Colombia	53.86
27	Turkey	53.70
28	Kazakhstan	53.46
29	China	51.72
30	Tunisia	50.68
31	Russia	47.29
32	Philippines	46.81
33	India	46.58
34	Indonesia	46.29
35	Jordan	44.52
36	South Africa	44.49
37	Thailand	43.83
38	Argentina	42.14
39	Egypt	41.05
40	Venezuela	39.72
41	Mauritius	36.67
42	Kenya	32.84
43	Ecuador	32.32
44	Pakistan	27.99
45	Ghana	27.68
46	Senegal	25.38
47	Vietnam	24.32
48	Nigeria	23.57
49	Uganda	20.25
50	Morocco	19.39
51	Tanzania	18.64
52	Nepal	18.37
53	Cameroon	15.10
54	Mali	13.67
55	Bangladesh	13.60
56	Namibia	13.57
57	Ethiopia	10.89
58	Benin	10.43
59	Burkina Faso	8.51
60	Zimbabwe	1.94
61	Yemen	0.00
