= Warhol worm =

Computer worm

A Warhol worm is a computer worm that spreads as fast as physically possible, infecting all vulnerable machines on the entire Internet in 15 minutes or less. The term is based on the claim that "in the future, everyone will have 15 minutes of fame", which has been misattributed to Andy Warhol. A 2002 paper presented at the 11th USENIX Security Symposium proposed designs for better worms, such as a "flash worm" that identifies a hit-list of vulnerable targets before attacking.

In 2003, SQL Slammer became the first observed example of a Warhol worm. The mechanism of SQL Slammer's spread used a pseudo-random number generator seeded from a system variable to determine which IP addresses to attack next for a rapid, unpredictable spread.

According to an analysis of the SQL Slammer outbreak by the Center for Applied Internet Data Analysis (CAIDA), its growth followed an exponential curve with a doubling time of 8.5 seconds in the early phases of the attack, which was only slowed by the collapse of many networks because of the denial of service attack caused by SQL Slammer's traffic. 90% of all vulnerable machines were infected within 10 minutes, showing that the original estimate for infection speed was roughly correct.
