= Smallband =

Slow Internet connection to maintain data over use

Smallband (or reduced speed) is the slow internet connection speed given by Belgian Internet service providers when the monthly data-transfer limit has been reached. The internet providers themselves do not use the word smallband in official communications; they simply refer to reduced speed.

According to the Acceptable use policy of most providers where this limitation is in place, the speed is comparable to that of an old dial-up connection. However, there were numerous complaints by customers that the actual speed was lower. In response to these complaints, Telenet (cable internet provider) in October 2007 increased the speed from 32 kbps downstream and 16 kbit/s upstream to 192 kbit/s downstream and 64 kbit/s upstream, for http data traffic only. All other traffic shaping remained at 32 kbit/s downstream and 16 kbit/s upstream.

When the limit was reached, users could choose between surfing at reduced speed for the rest of the month or buy extra blocks (1 block = 1 gig) at higher prices. Additional data typically cost around 1 euro per gigabyte. Some ISPs offered bigger blocks at a lower price; subscribers of Belgacom's "Internet Favorite" for instance could buy a 20 gigabyte block for 5 euro.

Subscribers to unlimited plans were limited by the fair use policy, which warned against excessive use.

The word 'smallband' (double l) in Dutch is an anglicism. It is created as an opposite for the Dutch word 'breedband' (broadband), however it is an incorrect translation. The opposite of broadband in English is narrowband. The Dutch translation for narrow is 'nauw' (same etymology) or 'smal' (single l), so a more correct Dutch translation would be 'nauwband' or 'smalband' (single l).
