= Sequenced Packet Exchange =

Network protocol

Sequenced Packet Exchange (SPX) is a protocol in the IPX/SPX protocol stack that corresponds to a connection-oriented transport layer protocol in the OSI model. Being reliable and connection-oriented, it is analogous to the Transmission Control Protocol (TCP) of TCP/IP, but it is a datagram protocol, rather than a stream protocol.

== SPX packet structure ==
Each SPX packet begins with a header with the following structure:

Octets	Field
1	Connection Control
1	Datastream Type
2	Source Connection Id
2	Destination Connection Id (0xFFFF = unknown)
2	Sequence Number
2	Acknowledgement Number
2	Allocation Number (The number of outstanding receive buffers available)
0–534	data

The Connection Control fields contains 4 single-bit flags:

Weight	Meaning
0x10	End-of-message
0x20	Attention
0x40	Acknowledgement Required
0x80	System Packet

The Datastream Type serves to close the SPX connection. For this purpose two values are used:

Value	Meaning
0x00–0xFD	Available for client use
0xFE	End-of-Connection
0xFF	End-of-Connection Acknowledgement
