= Holddown =

Holddown works by having each router start a timer when it first receive information about a network that is unreachable. Until the timer expires, the router will discard any subsequent route messages that indicate the route is actually reachable. It can resolve situations where multiple routers are connected indirectly. There are realistic scenarios where split horizon and split horizon with poisoned reverse are ineffective.

In other words, a holddown prevents a router from receiving route updates until the network appears to be stable—until either an interface stops changing state (flapping) or a better route is learned.

Holddowns are typically implemented with timers. If the router detects that a network is unreachable, the timer is started. The router will then wait a preset number of seconds until the network stabilizes. When the timer expires, the router will begin receiving its routing updates from other routers. For example, in RIP, the default holddown timer is set to 180 seconds.
