= Hierarchical routing =

Network routing based on hierarchical addressing

Hierarchical routing is a method of routing in networks that is based on hierarchical addressing.

== Background ==
Most Transmission Control Protocol/Internet Protocol (TCP/IP) routing is based on a two-level hierarchical routing in which an IP address is divided into a network portion and a host portion. Gateways use only the network portion until an IP datagram reaches a gateway that can deliver it directly. Additional levels of hierarchical routing are introduced by the addition of subnetworks.

== Description ==
Hierarchical routing is the procedure of arranging routers in a hierarchical manner. A good example would be to consider a corporate intranet. Most corporate intranets consist of a high speed backbone network. Connected to this backbone are routers which are in turn connected to a particular workgroup. These workgroups occupy a unique LAN. The reason this is a good arrangement is because even though there might be dozens of different workgroups, the span (maximum hop count to get from one host to any other host on the network) is 2. Even if the workgroups divided their LAN network into smaller partitions, the span could only increase to 4 in this particular example.

Considering alternative solutions with every router connected to every other router, or if every router was connected to 2 routers, shows the convenience of hierarchical routing. It decreases the complexity of network topology, increases routing efficiency, and causes much less congestion because of fewer routing advertisements. With hierarchical routing, only core routers connected to the backbone are aware of all routes. Routers that lie within a LAN only know about routes in the LAN. Unrecognized destinations are passed to the default route.

== See also ==
- Fisheye State Routing
- Hierarchical state routing
