= Destination-Sequenced Distance Vector routing =

Routing scheme for ad hoc mobile networks

Destination-Sequenced Distance-Vector Routing (DSDV) is a table-driven routing scheme for ad hoc mobile networks based on the Bellman–Ford algorithm. It was developed by C. Perkins and P. Bhagwat in 1994. The main contribution of the algorithm was to solve the routing loop problem. Each entry in the routing table contains a sequence number, the sequence numbers are generally even if a link is present; else, an odd number is used. The number is generated by the destination, and the emitter needs to send out the next update with this number. Routing information is distributed between nodes by sending full dumps infrequently and smaller incremental updates more frequently.

For example, the routing table of Node A in this network is

Destination	Next Hop	Number of Hops	Sequence Number	Install Time
A	A	0	A 46	002000
B	B	1	B 36	002200
C	B	2	C 28	002500

Naturally the table contains description of all possible paths reachable by node A, along with the next hop, number of hops and sequence number.

== Selection of Route ==
If a router receives new information, then it uses the latest sequence number. If the sequence number is the same as the one already in the table, the route with the better metric is used. Stale entries are those entries that have not been updated for a while. Such entries as well as the routes using those nodes as next hops are deleted.

== Advantages ==
The availability of paths to all destinations in network always shows that less delay is required in the path set up process.

The method of incremental update with sequence number labels, marks the existing wired network protocols adaptable to Ad-hoc wireless networks. Therefore, all available wired network protocol can be useful to ad hoc wireless networks with less modification.

== Disadvantages ==
DSDV requires a regular update of its routing tables, which uses up battery power and a small amount of bandwidth even when the network is idle.

Whenever the topology of the network changes, a new sequence number is necessary before the network re-converges; thus, DSDV is not suitable for highly dynamic or large scale networks. (As in all distance-vector protocols, this does not perturb traffic in regions of the network that are not concerned by the topology change.)

== Influence ==
While DSDV itself does not appear to be much used today, other protocols have used similar techniques. The best-known sequenced distance vector protocol is AODV, which, by virtue of being a reactive protocol, can use simpler sequencing heuristics. Babel is an attempt at making DSDV more robust, more efficient and more widely applicable while staying within the framework of proactive protocols.
