= Fritz! =

German consumer electronics company

FRITZ! GmbH

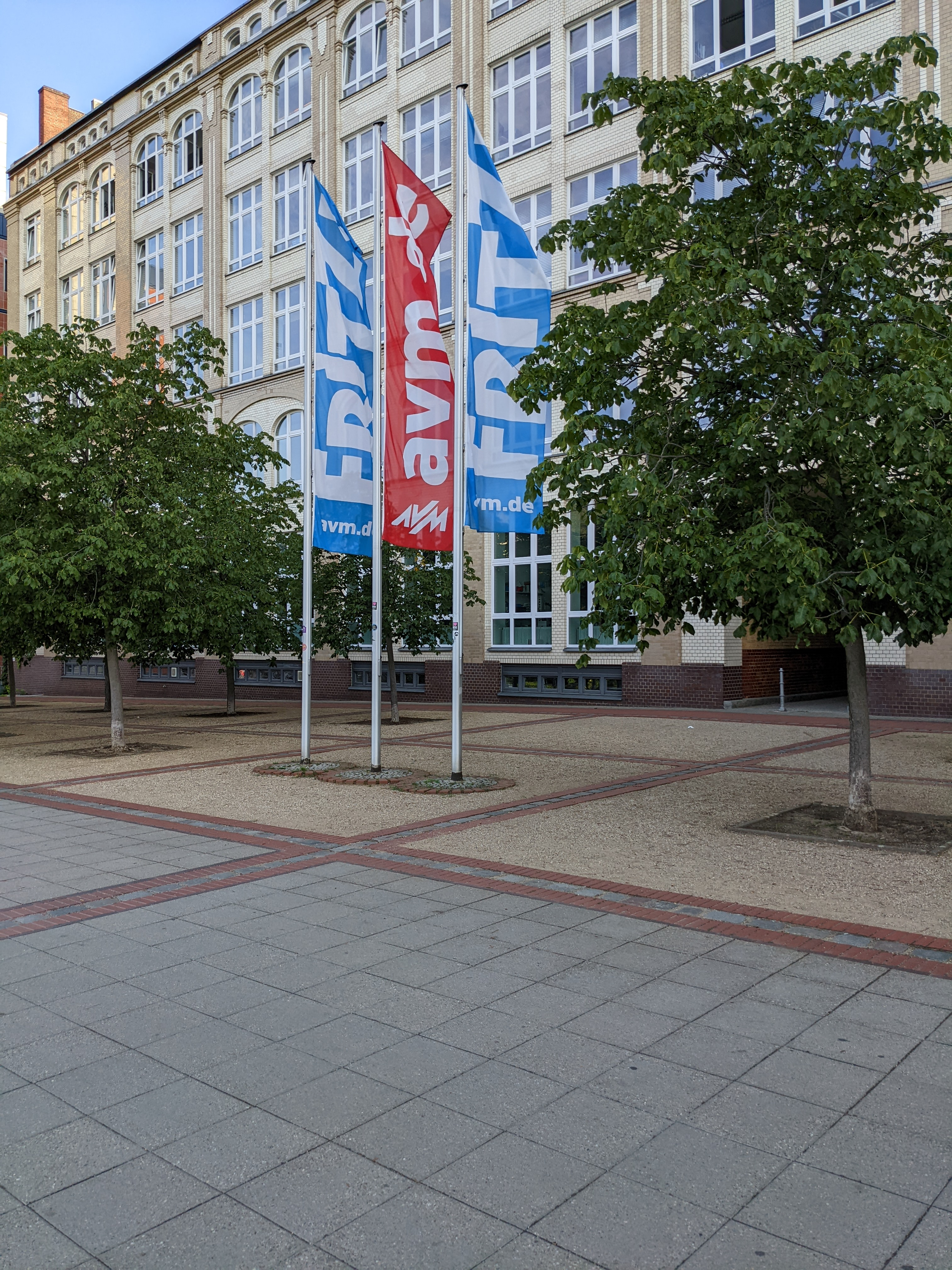
- FRITZ! headquarters in Berlin, Germany
- Formerly: AVM GmbH (1986–2025)
- Type: Private
- Industry: Electronics; Telecommunications
- Founded: 1986; 40 years ago
- Founder: Johannes Nill; Peter Faxel; Ulrich Müller-Albring; Jörg-Detlef Gebert
- Headquarters: Berlin, Germany
- Area served: Worldwide
- Products: DSL, cable and VoIP broadband modems, routers, VoIP phones
- Revenue: Euro 620 Million (2022)
- Number of employees: 840 (2020)
- Website: fritz.com/en

Fritz! GmbH (formerly AVM GmbH) is a German consumer electronics company that produces communications, networking devices such as DSL, ISDN, Wireless and VoIP products.

Founded in 1986, it is headquartered in Berlin.

It had sales of €620 million in 2022 with 880 employees achieving an estimated profit between €80 and €90 million. It is well known for its popular Fritz!Box series.

== Products ==
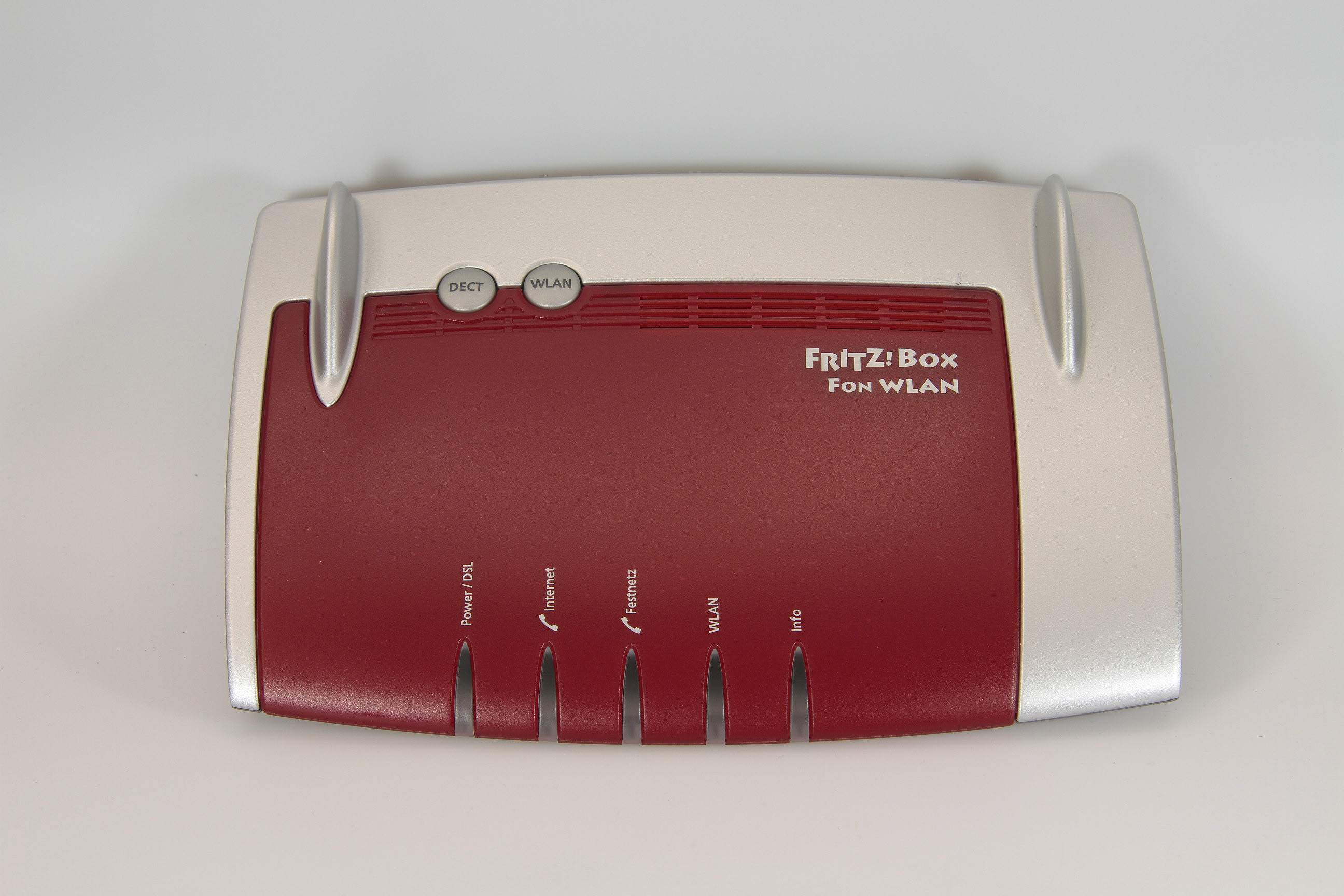
AVM Fritz!Box 7390 from 2009

Fritz! is the most popular producer for consumer and home networking products in Germany. The company has a share of around 50 percent of the German market for routers for private users. It sells DSL and cable routers, WLAN and other networking products:

- Fritz!Box – Home networking for DSL, cable, FTTH and LTE.
- Fritz!Fon – HD telephony, Internet services and music for the Fritz!Box.
- Fritz!WLAN – Range extender and USB WLAN sticks.
- Fritz!DECT – Smart home appliances
- Fritz!Powerline – power-line expands home networking via the existing power supply.
- Fritz!Apps – Applications for smartphones for the Fritz! range of products.
- Fritz!Card – Internal ISDN card for the PCI slot.

== History ==
The company was founded as AVM in 1986 by four university students: Johannes Nill, Peter Faxel, Ulrich Müller-Albring and Jörg-Detlef Gebert. The name was an acronym for Audio Visuelles Marketing and reflected the company's original focus on providing BTX services. AVM sold its first ISDN card in 1989 for 4.300 D-Mark (2.150 Euro) to larger businesses. The company's breakthrough came in 1995 with the introduction of the Fritz! brand and the Fritz!Card, an ISDN card for PCs. The name Fritz! was chosen "because a non-technical name has been sought which should indicate winking German workmanship abroad." AVM's market share for ISDN cards grew continuously to a peak of over 80 percent in 2004.

At CeBIT 2004 AVM introduced the first Fritz!Box, a combination of DSL modem and router, later with Wi-Fi and integrated PBX. Published in 2007, the Fritz!Box Fon WLAN 7270 was seen as innovative by supporting WLAN Draft-N (IEEE 802.11n) and containing a DECT base station and a media server.

According to market research firm IDC (2007), AVM had a market share in CPE of 60 percent in Germany and 18 percent in Europe.

In July 2025, AVM changed its corporate name to Fritz!, citing the Fritz! brand's approximately 80 percent consumer awareness in Germany as the reason for unifying the company's identity with its flagship product line.

In recent years, Fritz! is also engaging in the field of home automation.

== See also ==
- List of VoIP companies
