= Default gateway =

Node in a computer network

A default gateway is the node in a computer network using the Internet protocol suite that serves as the forwarding host (router) to other networks when no other route specification matches the destination IP address of a packet.

== Role ==
A gateway is a network node that serves as an access point to another network, often involving not only a change of addressing, but also a different networking technology. More narrowly defined, a router merely forwards packets between networks with different network prefixes. The networking software stack of each computer contains a routing table that specifies which interface is used for transmission and which router on the network is responsible for forwarding to a specific set of addresses. If none of these forwarding rules is appropriate for a given destination address, the default gateway is chosen as the router of last resort. The default gateway can be specified by the route command to configure the node's routing table and default route.

In a home or small office environment, the default gateway is a device, such as a DSL router or cable router, that connects the local network to the Internet. It serves as the default gateway for all network devices.

Enterprise network systems may require many internal network segments. A device wishing to communicate with a host on the public Internet, for example, forwards the packet to the default gateway for its network segment. This router also has a default route configured to a device on an adjacent network, one hop closer to the public network.

== Examples ==
=== Single router ===
The following example shows IP addresses that might be used with an office network that consists of six hosts plus a router. The six hosts addresses are:

- 192.168.4.3
- 192.168.4.4
- 192.168.4.5
- 192.168.4.6
- 192.168.4.7
- 192.168.4.8

The router's inside address is:

- 192.168.4.1

The network has a subnet mask of:

- 255.255.255.0 (/24 in CIDR notation)

The address range assignable to hosts is from 192.168.4.1 to 192.168.4.254. TCP/IP defines the addresses 192.168.4.0 (network ID address) and 192.168.4.255 (broadcast IP address).

The office's hosts send packets to addresses within this range directly, by resolving the destination IP address into a MAC address with the Address Resolution Protocol (ARP) sequence and then encapsulates the IP packet into a MAC frame addressed to the destination host.

A packet addressed outside of this range, for this example, addressed to 192.168.12.3, cannot travel directly to the destination. Instead it must be sent to the default gateway for further routing to their ultimate destination. In this example, the default gateway uses the IP address 192.168.4.1, which is resolved into a MAC address with ARP in the usual way. The destination IP address remains 192.168.12.3, but the next-hop MAC address is that of the gateway, rather than of the ultimate destination.

=== Multi-router ===
In another example, a network with three routers and three hosts is connected to the Internet through Router1. The hosts' addresses are:

Topological layout of described network

- PC1 10.1.1.100, default gateway 10.1.1.1
- PC2 172.16.1.100, default gateway 172.16.1.1
- PC3 192.168.1.100, default gateway 192.168.1.96

Router1:

- Interface 1 5.5.5.2 (public IP)
- Interface 2 10.1.1.1

Router2:

- Interface 1 10.1.1.2
- Interface 2 172.16.1.1

Router3:

- Interface 1 10.1.1.3
- Interface 2 192.168.1.96

Network mask in all networks: 255.255.255.0 (/24 in CIDR notation). If the routers do not use a routing protocol to discover which network each router is connected to, then the routing table of each router must be set up.

Router1

Network ID	Network mask	Gateway	Interface (examples; may vary)	Cost (decreases the TTL)
0.0.0.0 (default route)	0.0.0.0	Assigned by ISP (e.g., 5.5.5.1)	eth0 (Ethernet 1st adapter)	10
10.1.1.0	255.255.255.0	10.1.1.1	eth1 (Ethernet 2nd adapter)	10
172.16.1.0	255.255.255.0	10.1.1.2	eth1 (Ethernet 2nd adapter)	10
192.168.1.0	255.255.255.0	10.1.1.3	eth1 (Ethernet 2nd adapter)	10

Router2

Network ID	Network mask	Gateway	Interface (examples; may vary)	Cost (decreases the TTL)
0.0.0.0 (default route)	0.0.0.0	10.1.1.1	eth0 (Ethernet 1st adapter)	10
172.16.1.0	255.255.255.0	172.16.1.1	eth1 (Ethernet 2nd adapter)	10

Router3

Network ID	Network mask	Gateway	Interface (examples; may vary)	Cost (decreases the TTL)
0.0.0.0 (default route)	0.0.0.0	10.1.1.1	eth0 (Ethernet 1st adapter)	10
192.168.1.0	255.255.255.0	192.168.1.96	eth1 (Ethernet 2nd adapter)	10

Router2 manages its attached networks and default gateway; router 3 does the same; router 1 manages all routes within the internal networks.

Accessing internal resources
If PC2 (172.16.1.100) needs to access PC3 (192.168.1.100), since PC2 has no route to 192.168.1.100 it will send packets for PC3 to its default gateway (router2). Router2 also has no route to PC3, and it will forward the packets to its default gateway (router1). Router1 has a route for this network (192.168.1.0/24) so router1 will forward the packets to router3, which will deliver the packets to PC3; reply packets will follow the reverse path back to PC2.
Accessing external resources
If any of the computers try to access a webpage on the Internet, like https://en.wikipedia.org/, the destination will first be resolved to an IP address by using DNS-resolving. The IP-address could be 91.198.174.2. In this example, none of the internal routers know the route to that host, so they will forward the packet through router1's gateway or default route. Every router on the packet's way to the destination will check whether the packet's destination IP-address matches any known network routes. If a router finds a match, it will forward the packet through that route; if not, it will send the packet to its own default gateway. Each router encountered on the way will store the packet ID and where it came from so that it can pass the response packet back to the sender. The packet contains source and destination, not all router hops. At last the packet will arrive back to router1, which will check for matching packet ID and route it accordingly through router2 or router3 or directly to PC1 (which was connected in the same network segment as router1).
The packet doesn't return
If router1 routing table does not have any route to 192.168.1.0/24, and PC3 tries to access a resource outside its own network, then the outgoing routing will work until the reply is fed back to router1. Since the route is unknown to router1, it will go to router1's default gateway, and never reach router3. In the logs of the resource they will trace the request, but the requestor will never get any information. The packet will die because the TTL-value decreased to less than 1 when it was traveling through the routers, or the router will see that it has a private IP and discard it. This could be discovered by using the Microsoft Windows utility PathPing or MTR on Unix-like operating systems, since the ping will stop at the router which has no route or a wrong route. (Note that some routers will not reply to pinging).

== Utilities ==
Various utility software can show the default gateway. On Windows, ipconfig may be used, while on Unix systems, ifconfig or netstat may be used. On Linux netstat has been superseded by iproute2.
