= Network interface =

Network interface may refer to:

- Network interface controller, a computer hardware component that connects a computer to a computer network
- Network interface device, a device that serves as the demarcation point between a telephone carrier's local loop and the customer's wiring
- Virtual network interface, an abstract virtualized representation of a computer network interface
  - Loopback interface, a virtual network interface that connects a host to itself
