= UNIX Network Programming =

1990 book by W. Richard Stevens

- Author: W. Richard Stevens, Bill Fenner, Andrew M. Rudoff (third ed)
- Language: English
- Genre: non-fiction
- Publisher: Prentice Hall; Addison-Wesley (third edition)
- Publication date: 1990 (first ed); 1998 (second ed); 2003 (third ed)
- Pages: 768 (first edition); 1009 (second edition); 1024 (third edition)
- ISBN: 978-0139498763 (first ed); 978-0134900124 (second ed, vol 1); 978-0130810816 (second ed, vol 2); 978-0131411555 (third ed)

Unix Network Programming is a book written by W. Richard Stevens. It was published in 1990 by Prentice Hall and covers many topics regarding UNIX networking and Computer network programming. The book focuses on the design and development of network software under UNIX. The book provides descriptions of how and why a given solution works and includes 15,000 lines of C code. The book's summary describes it as "for programmers seeking an in depth tutorial on sockets, transport level interface (TLI), interprocess communications (IPC) facilities under System V and BSD UNIX." The book has been translated into several languages, including Chinese, Italian, German, Japanese and others.

Later editions have expanded into two volumes, Volume 1: The Sockets Networking API and Volume 2: Interprocess Communications.

In the movie Wayne's World 2, the book is briefly referenced.
