= Nastygram =

The term nastygram may refer to:

- A cease and desist letter, often one received from a copyright holder
- A Christmas tree packet (networking)
- A demand letter used to collect a debt or penalties due to a breach of contract
