= Bogon filtering =

Discarding network packets with bogus addressing

Bogon filtering is the practice of blocking packets known as bogons, which are ones sent to a computer network claiming to originate from invalid or bogus IP addresses, known as bogon addresses.

== Etymology ==
The term bogon stems from hacker jargon, with the earliest appearance in the Jargon File in version 1.5.0 (dated 1983). It is defined as the quantum of bogosity, or the property of being bogus. A bogon packet is frequently bogus both in the conventional sense of being forged for illegitimate purposes, and in the hackish sense of being incorrect, absurd, and useless. An alternative etymology suggests that 'bogon' derives from a portmanteau of "bogus logon", or a logon from a place you know no one can actually logon.

== Types of bogon addresses ==
Areas of unallocated address space are called the bogon space. These are addresses that are not in any range allocated by the Internet Assigned Numbers Authority (IANA) or a regional Internet registry (RIR) for public Internet use.

Bogon IPs also include some address ranges from allocated space. For example, addresses reserved for private networks, such as those in 10.0.0.0/8, 172.16.0.0/12, 192.168.0.0/16 and fc00::/7, loopback interfaces like 127.0.0.0/8 and ::1, and link-local addresses like 169.254.0.0/16 and fe80::/64 can be bogon addresses. Addresses for Carrier-grade NAT, Teredo, and 6to4 and documentation prefixes also fall into this category. IP packets using these as source addresses are sometimes known as Martian packets.

== Blocking and filtering ==
Many ISPs and end-user firewalls filter and block bogons, because they have no legitimate use, and usually are the result of accidental misconfiguration or malicious intent. Bogons can be filtered by using router access-control lists (ACLs), or by BGP blackholing.

== Former bogon addresses ==
IP addresses in the bogon space may cease to be bogons because IANA frequently assigns new addresses. Announcements of new assignments are often published on network operators' mailing lists (such as NANOG) to ensure that bogon filtering can be removed for addresses that have become legitimate. For example, addresses in 49.0.0.0/8 were not allocated prior to August 2010, but are now used by APNIC.

As of November 2011, the Internet Engineering Task Force (IETF) recommends that, since there are no longer any unallocated IPv4 /8s, IPv4 bogon filters based on registration status should be removed. However, bogon filters still need to check for Martian packets.

== See also ==
- Reverse-path forwarding
- IP hijacking
- IP address spoofing
- Ingress filtering
- Internet background noise
