= Old Red Cracker =

Anonymous reverser

Old Red Cracker (abbreviated +ORC) is an anonymous reverser. He was one of the pioneers of publishing cracking lessons on the Internet. While his identity is unknown, reverse engineer Fravia had email correspondence with him and spread his tutorials.

Old Red Cracker founded the so-called "High Cracking University" (+HCU), to conduct research into Reverse Code Engineering (RCE). The addition of the "+" sign in front of the nickname of a reverser signified membership in the +HCU. +HCU published a new reverse engineering problem annually.

== See also ==
- Security hacker
- Software cracking
