= Fritz!Box =

Brand of residential gateway devices

Fritz!Box

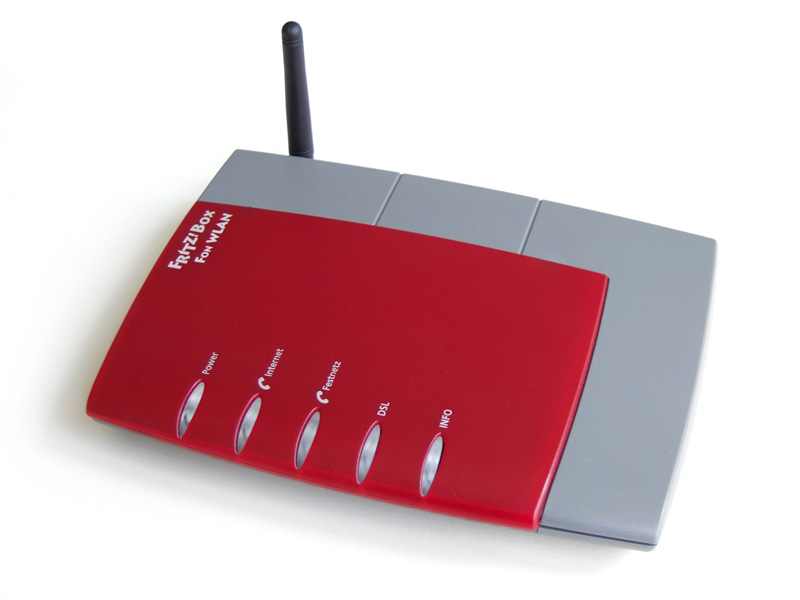
Fritz!Box Fon WLAN 7170

Fritz!Box is a series of residential gateway devices produced by the German company AVM. In 2010 it was estimated the series had a market share of 68% of the digital subscriber line (DSL) consumer equipment in Germany. Fritz!Boxes run Fritz!OS.

== Functionality ==
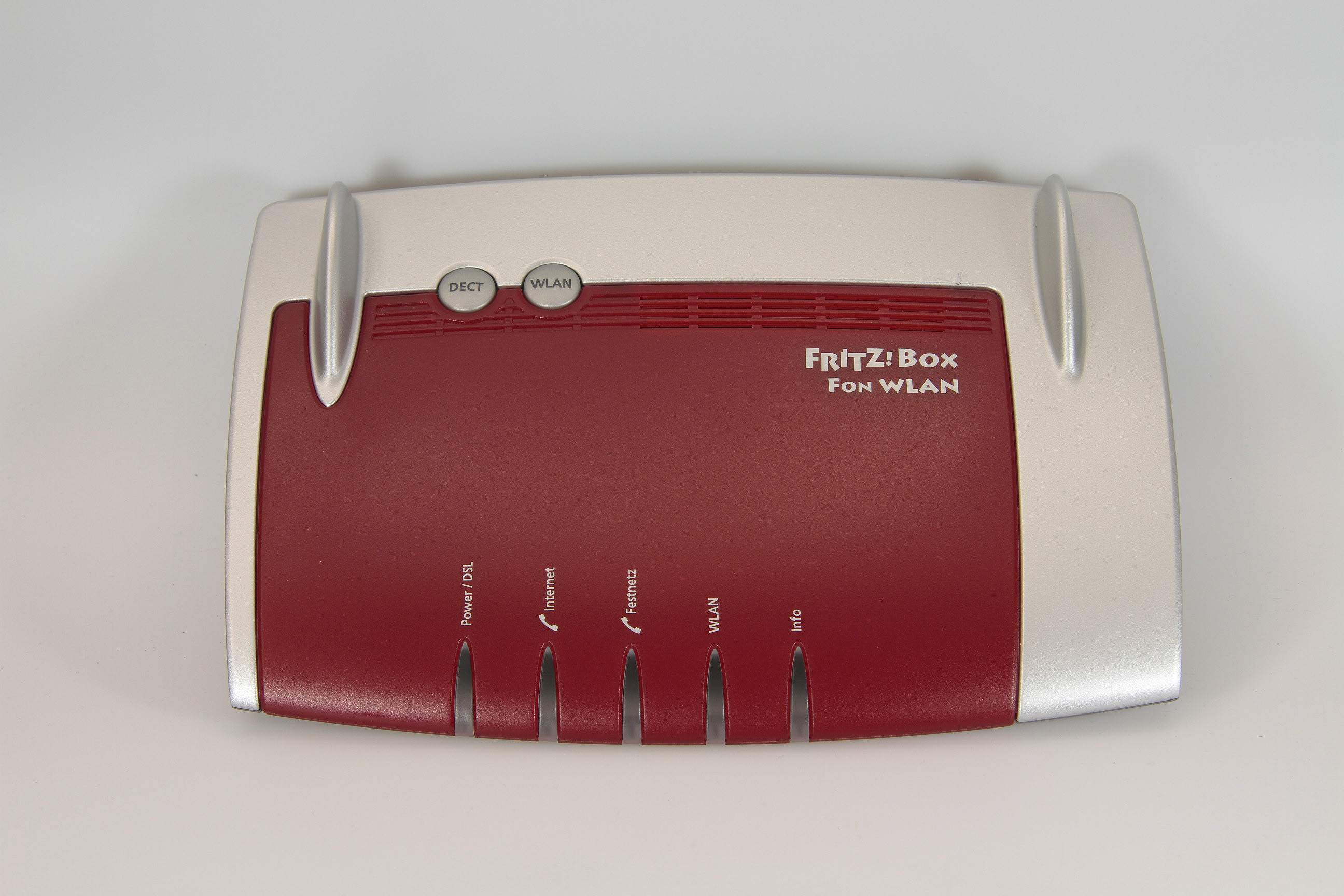
Fritz!Box Fon WLAN 7390

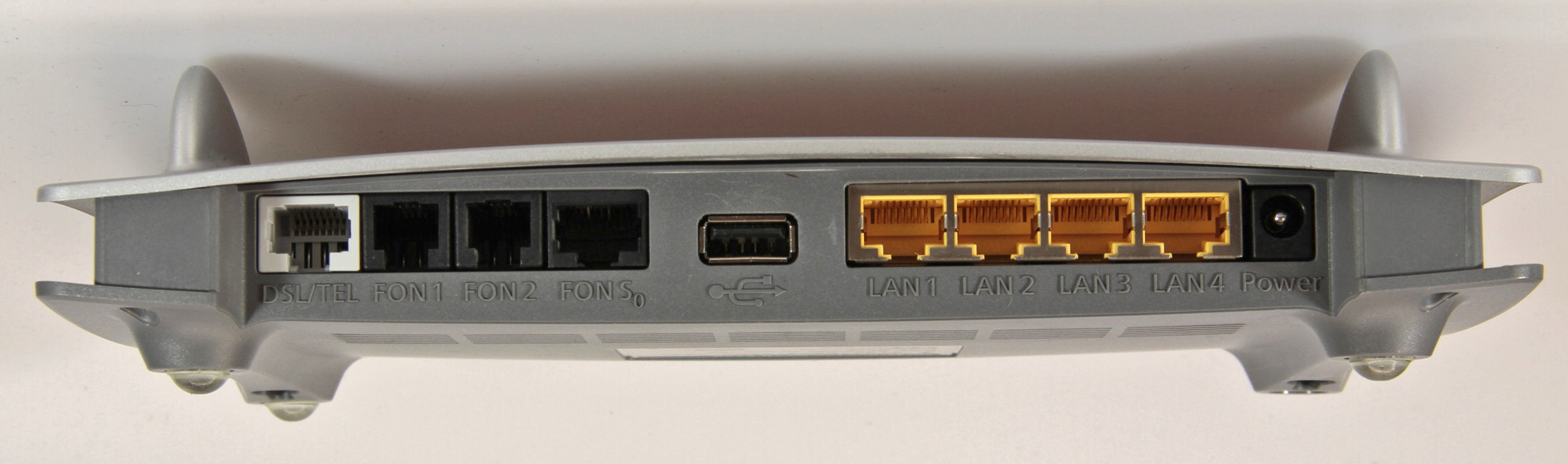
Fritz!Box connections

Typical functionality of a Fritz!Box includes:

- a built-in broadband bridge:
  - a DSL modem (most models)
  - a cable modem (6xxx series)
  - a 3G or LTE modem (68xx series)
  - a fibre broadband bridge (54xx, 55xx series)
- a built-in LAN–WAN router, usually with a network switch supporting Fast Ethernet or, in newer models, Gigabit Ethernet
- in nearly all models, a wireless access point:
  - in the 2.4 GHz radio band, in accordance with IEEE 802.11b (11 Mbit/s), IEEE 802.11g (54 Mbit/s) and IEEE 802.11n (up to 450 Mbit/s) standards
  - in many newer models, also in the 5 GHz radio band, supporting the IEEE 802.11a (54 Mbit/s), IEEE 802.11n (54 Mbit/s—450 Mbit/s) and IEEE 802.11ac (up to 1.27 Gbit/s) standards
- a PBX, particularly in the 7xxx series models:
  - a built-in SIP client for internet telephony (VoIP)
  - a DECT base station to connect cordless handsets
  - a SIP server to connect SIP-compliant phones or software devices
  - support for physical phones (extensions) connected via ISDN and/or analog interfaces
  - an answering machine and software-based fax
- in most models since 2006, a USB port to connect external storage or printer which may also be used to connect a e.g. a 3G or 4G mobile modem
- a NAS and a DLNA/UPnP compliant media server in most models with newer firmware

Many Fritz!Boxes offer wireless repeater functionality which, in earlier firmware versions, was compatible with the IEEE 802.11-1999 standard wireless distribution system before being replaced with a proprietary system in more recent firmware versions.

IPv6 support was enabled from firmware version 4.90 onwards.

Fritz!Box devices operate under the control of Fritz!OS, a specialized Linux distribution, which provides a graphical web interface for user interaction.

== Domestic versions ==
Fritz!Box devices with an integrated DSL modem come in three versions. The version for the German market uses an ISDN interface for voice. For the Austrian and Swiss markets the voice interface use conventional POTS and also has a German-language user interface. The international version has a multi-language web interface and provides support for POTS and usually ISDN for voice. While the international version supports both the most common ADSL Annex A POTS and ADSL Annex B ISDN, the German version offers hardware support for Annex B only, which is the sole standard used in Germany, with additional support for Annex J in newer models.
