= List of reserved IP addresses =

Below is a list of reserved Internet Protocol (IP) addresses.

In the Internet addressing architecture, the Internet Engineering Task Force (IETF) and the Internet Assigned Numbers Authority (IANA) have reserved various IP addresses for special purposes.

== IPv4 ==
IPv4 designates special usage or applications for various addresses or address blocks:

Special address blocks
Address block (CIDR)	Address range	Number of addresses	Scope	Description
0.0.0.0/8	0.0.0.0–0.255.255.255	16777216	Software	Current (local, "this") network
10.0.0.0/8	10.0.0.0–10.255.255.255	16777216	Private network	Used for local communications within a private network
100.64.0.0/10	100.64.0.0–100.127.255.255	4194304	Private network	Shared address space for communications between a service provider and its subscribers when using a carrier-grade NAT
127.0.0.0/8	127.0.0.0–127.255.255.255	16777216	Host	Used for loopback addresses to the localhost
169.254.0.0/16	169.254.0.0–169.254.255.255	65536	Subnet	Used for link-local addresses between two hosts on a single link when no IP address is otherwise specified, such as would have normally been retrieved from a DHCP server
172.16.0.0/12	172.16.0.0–172.31.255.255	1048576	Private network	Used for local communications within a private network
192.0.0.0/24	192.0.0.0–192.0.0.255	256	Private network	IETF Protocol Assignments, DS-Lite (/29)
192.0.2.0/24	192.0.2.0–192.0.2.255	256	Documentation	Assigned as TEST-NET-1, documentation and examples
192.88.99.0/24	192.88.99.0–192.88.99.255	256	Internet	Reserved. Formerly used for IPv6 to IPv4 relay (included IPv6 address block 2002::/16).
192.168.0.0/16	192.168.0.0–192.168.255.255	65536	Private network	Used for local communications within a private network
198.18.0.0/15	198.18.0.0–198.19.255.255	131072	Private network	Used for benchmark testing of inter-network communications between two separate subnets
198.51.100.0/24	198.51.100.0–198.51.100.255	256	Documentation	Assigned as TEST-NET-2, documentation and examples
203.0.113.0/24	203.0.113.0–203.0.113.255	256	Documentation	Assigned as TEST-NET-3, documentation and examples
224.0.0.0/4	224.0.0.0–239.255.255.255	268435456	Internet	In use for multicast (former Class D network)
233.252.0.0/24	233.252.0.0–233.252.0.255	256	Documentation	Assigned as MCAST-TEST-NET, documentation and examples (This is part of the above multicast space.)
240.0.0.0/4	240.0.0.0–255.255.255.254	268435455	Internet	Reserved for future use (former Class E network)
255.255.255.255/32	255.255.255.255	1	Subnet	Reserved for the "limited broadcast" destination address

== IPv6 ==
IPv6 assigns special uses or applications for various IP addresses:

Special address blocks
Address block (CIDR)	First address	Last address	Number of addresses	Usage	Purpose
::/128	::	::	1	Software	Unspecified address
::1/128	::1	::1	1	Host	Loopback address—a virtual interface that loops all traffic back to itself, the localhost
::ffff:0:0/96	::ffff:0.0.0.0 ::ffff:0:0	::ffff:255.255.255.255 ::ffff:ffff:ffff	2^{32}	Software	IPv4-mapped addresses
64:ff9b::/96	64:ff9b::0.0.0.0 64:ff9b::0:0	64:ff9b::255.255.255.255 64:ff9b::ffff:ffff	2^{32}	The global Internet	NAT64 IPv4/IPv6 translation
64:ff9b:1::/48	64:ff9b:1::	64:ff9b:1:ffff:ffff:ffff:ffff:ffff	2^{80}, with 2^{48} for each IPv4	Private internets	local-use IPv4/IPv6 translation
100::/64	100::	100::ffff:ffff:ffff:ffff	2^{64}	Routing	Discard prefix
2001::/32	2001::	2001:0:ffff:ffff:ffff:ffff:ffff:ffff	2^{96}	The global Internet	Teredo tunneling
2001:20::/28	2001:20::	2001:2f:ffff:ffff:ffff:ffff:ffff:ffff	2^{100}	Software	ORCHIDv2
2001:db8::/32	2001:db8::	2001:db8:ffff:ffff:ffff:ffff:ffff:ffff	2^{96}	Documentation	Addresses used in documentation and example source code
2002::/16	2002::	2002:ffff:ffff:ffff:ffff:ffff:ffff:ffff	2^{112}	The global Internet	The 6to4 addressing scheme
3fff::/20	3fff::	3fff:fff:ffff:ffff:ffff:ffff:ffff:ffff	2^{108}	Documentation	Addresses used in documentation and example source code
5f00::/16	5f00::	5f00:ffff:ffff:ffff:ffff:ffff:ffff:ffff	2^{112}	Routing	IPv6 Segment Routing (SRv6)
fc00::/7	fc00::	fdff:ffff:ffff:ffff:ffff:ffff:ffff:ffff	2^{121}	Private internets	Unique local address
fe80::/64 from fe80::/10	fe80::	fe80::ffff:ffff:ffff:ffff	2^{64}	Link	Link-local address
ff00::/8	ff00::	ffff:ffff:ffff:ffff:ffff:ffff:ffff:ffff	2^{120}	The global Internet	Multicast address

== See also ==
- Bogon filtering
- Martian packet
- Classless Inter-Domain Routing (CIDR)
- Top-level domain § Reserved domains
