= IPv4 shared address space =

Special purpose IPv4 network

An IPv4 shared address space is a block of Internet Protocol version 4 addresses for use by Internet service providers (ISPs) to alleviate the risk of address duplication with downstream private address networks. An example of use is in carrier-grade NAT (CGN) applications.

For such special purposes, the Internet Assigned Numbers Authority (IANA) has reserved a /10 size IPv4 address block to be used as shared address space. This block of addresses is specifically meant to be used for implementations of carrier-grade NAT, to connect customer-premises equipment (CPE) to the providers' core routers.

Instead of using unique addresses from the rapidly depleting pool of available globally unique IPv4 addresses, ISPs use addresses in 100.64.0.0/10 for this purpose. Because the network between CPEs and the ISP's routers is private to each ISP, all ISPs may share this block of addresses.

Devices evaluating whether an IPv4 address is public must be updated to recognize the new address space.

== Background ==
If an ISP deploys a CGN and uses private Internet address space (networks 10.0.0.0/8, 172.16.0.0/12, 192.168.0.0/16) to connect their customers, the risk arises for address collision with a customer's downstream network, resulting in routing failure of traffic to external destinations.

This prompted some ISPs to develop policy within the American Registry for Internet Numbers (ARIN) to allocate new private address space for CGNs. ARIN, however, deferred to the Internet Engineering Task Force (IETF) before implementing the policy, indicating that the matter was not typical allocation but a reservation for technical purposes.

In 2012, the IETF defined a Shared Address Space for use in ISP CGN deployments and NAT devices that can handle the same addresses occurring on both inbound and outbound interfaces. ARIN returned space to the IANA as needed for this allocation and "The allocated address block is 100.64.0.0/10".

== Transition to IPv6 ==
Its main purpose is to postpone the depletion of IPv4 addresses and the need to transition to IPv6, by allowing ISPs to introduce a second layer of NATting. A common practice was to give CPEs a unique public IPv4 address on their Internet-facing interface and use NAT to hide all addresses on the home LAN. Since the pool of available public IPv4 addresses is depleted, it is no longer possible for some ISPs to assign such unique IPv4 addresses to CPEs, because there are none left to them to acquire. Instead, an address in the 100.64.0.0/10 range is assigned on the CPE's Internet-facing interface, and this address is translated again to one of the public IPv4 addresses of the ISP's core routers. Using shared address space allows ISPs to continue to use IPv4 as they were used to. This scheme hides a large number of IP addresses behind a small set of public addresses, the same way the CPE does this locally, slowing down the rate IPv4 addresses are depleted. The shared address space contains 2^{22} or 4194304 addresses, so each ISP is able to connect at least over 4 million subscribers this way.

== Other occurrences ==
In BIND, empty reverse mapping zones for 100.64.0.0/16 through 100.127.0.0/16 (64 zones in total) are automatically created in the 'internal' view, if not configured otherwise.

== See also ==
- The list of other IPv4 special-use addresses.
