= Evolutionary Biology (book) =

1983 book by Eli C. Minkoff

- Author: Eli C. Minkoff
- Subject: Evolutionary biology
- Publisher: Addison-Wesley
- Publication date: 1983
- Pages: 627
- ISBN: 0-201-15890-6
- Dewey Decimal: 575 19
- LC Class: QH366.2 .M56 1983

Evolutionary Biology is a college-level evolutionary biology textbook written by Eli C. Minkoff that is 627 pages long. It was published in 1983 by Addison-Wesley. This is Minkoff's first foray into the world of college-level textbook authorship. The book contains an index and various biographical references.

== About the book ==
The textbook Evolutionary Biology was written and published in 1983 during which Minkoff was the head of the Biology department at Bates College. The book is written in a format to which it could be used in an evolutionary biology 101 course. The book contains over 25 chapters, for example, "The Origin and Early Evolution of Life".

== Bibliography ==
- Eli C. Minkoff (1983). Evolutionary Biology. 1st Edition. Addison-Wesley. ISBN 0-201-15890-6.
