= Packet drop attack =

Type of denial-of-service attack

In computer networking, a packet drop attack or blackhole attack is a type of denial-of-service attack in which a router that is supposed to relay packets instead discards them. This usually occurs from a router becoming compromised from a number of different causes. One cause mentioned in research is through a denial-of-service attack on the router using a known DDoS tool. Because packets are routinely dropped from a lossy network, the packet drop attack is very hard to detect and prevent.

The malicious router can also accomplish this attack selectively, e.g. by dropping packets for a particular network destination, at a certain time of the day, a packet every n packets or every t seconds, or a randomly selected portion of the packets. If the malicious router attempts to drop all packets that come in, the attack can actually be discovered fairly quickly through common networking tools such as traceroute. Also, when other routers notice that the compromised router is dropping all traffic, they will generally begin to remove that router from their forwarding tables and eventually no traffic will flow to the attack. However, if the malicious router begins dropping packets on a specific time period or over every n packets, it is often harder to detect because some traffic still flows across the network.

The packet drop attack can be frequently deployed to attack wireless ad hoc networks. Because wireless networks have a much different architecture than that of a typical wired network, a host can broadcast that it has the shortest path towards a destination. By doing this, all traffic will be directed to the host that has been compromised, and the host is able to drop packets at will. Also over a mobile ad hoc network, hosts are specifically vulnerable to collaborative attacks where multiple hosts will become compromised and deceive the other hosts on the network.

== See also ==
- Black hole (networking)
