= Martian packet =

IP packet on the public internet

A Martian packet is an IP packet seen on the public Internet that contains a source or destination address that is reserved for special use by the Internet Assigned Numbers Authority (IANA) as defined in RFC 1812, Appendix B Glossary (Martian Address Filtering). On the public Internet, such a packet either has a spoofed source address, and it cannot actually originate as claimed, or the packet cannot be delivered. The requirement to filter these packets (i.e., not forward them) is found in RFC 1812, Section 5.3.7 (Martian Address Filtering).

Martian packets commonly arise from IP address spoofing in denial-of-service attacks, but can also arise from network equipment malfunction or misconfiguration of a host.

In Linux terminology, a Martian packet is an IP packet received by the kernel on a specific interface, while routing tables indicate that the source IP is expected on another interface.

The name is derived from packet from Mars, meaning that packet seems to be not of this Earth.

== IPv4 and IPv6 ==
In both IPv4 and IPv6, a Martian packet has a source address, a destination address, or both within one of the special-use ranges.

== Transition mechanisms ==
=== 6to4 ===
6to4 is an IPv6 transition technology where the IPv6 address encodes the originating IPv4 address such that every IPv4 /32 has a corresponding, unique IPv6 /48 prefix. Because 6to4 relays use the encoded value for determining the end site of the 6to4 tunnel, 6to4 addresses corresponding to IPv4 Martians are not routable and should never appear on the public Internet.

=== Teredo tunneling ===
Teredo is another IPv6 transition technology that encodes the originating IPv4 address in the IPv6 address. However, the encoding format encodes the Teredo server address and tunnel information before the IPv4 client address. Thus there is no definable set of prefixes more specific than 2001:0::/32 for Teredo packets with Martian end-site addresses. It is, however, possible to spoof Teredo packets with the Teredo server IPv4 address set to a Martian.

== Implementation ==
Some of the large routers have functionality to filter out specifically for Martian Filtering packet and address.

- Juniper Junos OS has martians.
- Cisco IOS does not have Martian Filtering, and uses ip access-list
- Cisco Small Business has Martian Addresses

== See also ==
- Bogon filtering
- Christmas tree packet
- Broadcast storm
