= TCPware =

TCPware is a third party layered product published by "Process Software LLC" of Framingham, Massachusetts to add TCP/IP capabilities to Digital Equipment Corporation's VMS operating system. In the early 1990s Digital Equipment Corporation had an internal policy favoring their own product, DECnet. Meanwhile, many VMS users in governments, large corporations and universities were discovering the "TCP/IP based" internet and required third party software to enable connectivity to it.

TCPware was enhanced in subsequent releases. Version 2.2, in 1991, added support for Sybase database procucts using the standard VMS functions. It introduced remote procedure calls (RPCs) to support distributed computing. It also added tn3270 for IBM 3270 terminal emulation, and support for the Simple Network Management Protocol (SNMP). The current version is 6.1.

Two features of the TCPware APIs, the "Telnet Library" and the "FTP Library", allow a relatively inexperienced programmer to use a high level language to write software which will connect across the internet. Quite a bit of legacy software now relies on these modules. TCPware's "Telnet Library" can be used for other protocol transfers like HTTP and SMTP.

In the early 1990s, DEC produced its own version of UNIX called ULTRIX which supported TCP/IP. Almost as a "skunk works" project, it produced a layered product for VMS called UCX (Ultrix Communications Extensions) which later evolved into "TCPIP Services for OpenVMS".
