= Christmas tree packet =

Unit of data used in information technology

In information technology, a Christmas tree packet (also known as a kamikaze packet, nastygram, or lamp test segment) is a network message segment or packet with every option enabled for the particular network protocol in use.

== Background ==
Network packets contain a number of flags or options depending on the type of network protocol in use. Enabling options can elicit specific behaviors in the device receiving the packet and differences in the responses to the packets. By analyzing those differences, Christmas tree packets can be used as a method of TCP/IP stack fingerprinting, exposing the underlying nature of a TCP/IP stack by sending the packets and then awaiting and analyzing the responses. When used as part of scanning a system, the TCP header of a Christmas tree packet has the flags FIN, URG and PSH set. Many operating systems implement their compliance with the Internet Protocol standards in varying or incomplete ways. By observing how a host responds to an odd packet, such as a Christmas tree packet, inferences can be made regarding the host's operating system. Versions of Microsoft Windows, BSD/OS, HP-UX, Cisco IOS, MVS, and IRIX display behaviors that differ from the RFC standard when queried with said packets.

A large number of Christmas tree packets can also be used to conduct a DoS attack by exploiting the fact that Christmas tree packets require much more processing by routers and end-hosts than the "usual" packets do.

Christmas tree packets can be easily detected by intrusion-detection systems or more advanced firewalls. From a network security point of view, Christmas tree packets are always suspicious and indicate a high probability of network reconnaissance activities.

== See also ==
- Martian packet
