= Consumer network =

Correlation between embeddedness in social networks and consumer behaviour

The notion of consumer networks expresses the idea that people's embeddedness in social networks affects their behavior as consumers. Interactions within consumer networks such as information exchange and imitation can affect demand and market outcomes in ways not considered in the neoclassical theory of consumer choice.

== Economics ==
Economic research on the topic is not ample. In attempts to incorporate consumer networks into standard microeconomic models, some interesting implications have been found concerning market structure, market dynamics and the firm's profit maximizating decision.

It has been shown that under certain assumptions the structure of the consumer network can affect market structure. In certain scenarios, where consumers have a higher inclination to compare their habitually consumed product to that of their acquaintances, the equilibrium market structure can switch from oligopoly to monopoly.

In another model, which incorporates small world consumer networks into the profit function of the firm, it has been demonstrated that the density of the network significantly affects the optimal price the firm should charge and the optimal referral fee (paid to consumers who can convince another one to buy). On the other hand, the size of the network does not have an important effect on these.

A 2007 laboratory experiment found that increased density of consumer networks can reduce market inefficiencies caused by moral hazard. The ability of consumers to exchange information with more neighbors increases firms’ incentives to build a reputation through selling high quality products. Even a low level of density was found to isolated consumers who can rely only on their own experience.

== Marketing ==
Exploiting consumer networks for marketing purposes, through techniques such as viral marketing, word-of-mouth marketing, or network marketing, is increasingly experimented with by marketers, to the extent that "some developments in customer networking are ahead of empirical research, and a few seem ahead even of accepted theory". These might often be more effective than more traditional forms of advertising. A key task of such forms of marketing is to target the people who are opinion leaders regarding consumption, having many contacts and positive reputation. They are, in network science language, the hubs of consumer networks.

== See also ==
- Viral marketing
- Word-of-mouth marketing
