= W. Richard Stevens =

American writer (1951–1999)

- Born: William Richard Stevens; February 5, 1951; Luanshya, Northern Rhodesia
- Died: September 1, 1999 (aged 48); Tucson, Arizona, United States
- Education: University of Michigan; University of Arizona
- Known for: Advanced Programming in the UNIX Environment, TCP/IP Illustrated, UNIX Network Programming
- Scientific career
- Fields: Systems engineering

William Richard (Rich) Stevens (February 5, 1951 – September 1, 1999) was a Northern Rhodesia–born American author of computer science books, in particular books on Unix and TCP/IP.

== Biography ==
Richard Stevens was born in 1951 in Luanshya, Northern Rhodesia (now Zambia), where his father worked for the copper industry. The family later moved to Salt Lake City, Utah, Hurley, New Mexico, Washington, D.C., and Phalaborwa, South Africa. Stevens attended Fishburne Military School in Waynesboro, Virginia. He received a bachelor's degree in aerospace engineering from the University of Michigan in 1973 and both a master's degree (in 1978) and PhD (in 1982) in systems engineering from the University of Arizona. He moved to Tucson in 1975 where he was employed at Kitt Peak National Observatory as a computer programmer until 1982. From 1982 until 1990 he was Vice President of Computing Services at Health Systems International in New Haven, Connecticut. Stevens moved back to Tucson in 1990 where he pursued his career as an author and consultant. He was also an avid pilot and a part-time flight instructor during the 1970s.

Stevens died in 1999, at the age of 48. In 2000, he was posthumously awarded the USENIX Lifetime Achievement Award.

== Books ==
- 1979 – A Forth Primer – Computer History Museum Catalog Number 102803504
- 1990 – UNIX Network Programming – ISBN 0-13-949876-1
- 1992 – Advanced Programming in the UNIX Environment – ISBN 0-201-56317-7
- 1994 – TCP/IP Illustrated, Volume 1: The Protocols – ISBN 0-201-63346-9
- 1995 – TCP/IP Illustrated, Volume 2: The Implementation (with Gary R. Wright) – ISBN 0-201-63354-X
- 1996 – TCP/IP Illustrated, Volume 3: TCP for Transactions, HTTP, NNTP, and the UNIX Domain Protocols – ISBN 0-201-63495-3
- 1998 – UNIX Network Programming, Volume 1, Second Edition: Networking APIs: Sockets and XTI – ISBN 0-13-490012-X
- 1999 – UNIX Network Programming, Volume 2, Second Edition: Interprocess Communications – ISBN 0-13-081081-9
- 2003 – UNIX Network Programming Volume 1, Third Edition: The Sockets Networking API – ISBN 0-13-141155-1 (with Bill Fenner, and Andrew M. Rudoff)
- 2005 – Advanced Programming in the UNIX Environment, Second Edition – ISBN 0-321-52594-9 (with Stephen A. Rago)
- 2011 – TCP/IP Illustrated, Volume 1: The Protocols (2nd Edition) – ISBN 0-321-33631-3 (with Kevin R. Fall)
- 2013 – Advanced Programming in the UNIX Environment, Third Edition – ISBN 0-321-63773-9 (with Stephen A. Rago)

== RFCs ==
Stevens also co-authored several Request for Comments (RFC) documents for the Internet Engineering Task Force, the process by which the Internet's "technical and organizational notes" are disseminated. Stevens' RFCs covered updates to the Berkeley sockets API for IPv6, as well as a standard method of congestion control for TCP sessions.

- RFC 2133 – "Basic Socket Interface Extensions for IPv6," Obsolete.
- RFC 2553 – "Basic Socket Interface Extensions for IPv6," Obsolete.
- RFC 3493 – "Basic Socket Interface Extensions for IPv6," Informational.
- RFC 2292 – "Advanced Sockets API for IPv6," Obsolete.
- RFC 3542 – "Advanced Sockets Application Program Interface (API) for IPv6," Informational.
- RFC 2001 – "TCP Slow Start, Congestion Avoidance, Fast Retransmit, and Fast Recovery Algorithms," Obsolete.
- RFC 2581 – "TCP Congestion Control," Obsolete.
