= TCP/IP Illustrated =

1994–96 book series by Richard Stevens

- Volume 1 Volume 2 Volume 3
- Author: W. Richard Stevens; Kevin R. Fall; Gary R. Wright
- Language: English
- Series: Addison-Wesley Professional Computing Series
- Publisher: Addison–Wesley
- Publication date: 1994–96
- Publication place: United States
- Media type: Print (hardcover)

TCP/IP Illustrated is the name of a series of 3 books written by W. Richard Stevens. Unlike traditional books which explain the RFC specifications, Stevens goes into great detail using actual network traces to describe the protocol, hence its 'Illustrated' title.

The first book in the series, "Volume 1: The Protocols", is cited by hundreds of technical papers in ACM journals.

== Volumes ==
=== Volume 1: The Protocols ===
After a brief introduction to TCP/IP, Stevens takes a bottom-up approach by describing the protocol from the link layer and working up the protocol stack. The Second Edition was published on 15 November 2011.

=== Volume 2: The Implementation ===
500 illustrations, combined with 15,000 lines of actual code from the 4.4BSD-Lite release, serves as concrete examples of the concepts covered in Volume 1.

=== Volume 3: TCP for Transactions, HTTP, NNTP, and the UNIX Domain Protocols ===
This volume goes into detail on four topics:

- T/TCP (TCP for Transactions)
- HTTP (Hypertext Transfer Protocol)
- NNTP (Network News Transfer Protocol)
- UNIX Domain Protocols (see Unix domain socket)

As with Volume 2, examples from 4.4BSD-Lite are used.
