= Cable router =

Cable router is a term used for two different types of communications equipment.

In satellite television and radio-frequency distribution, a Single Cable Router (SCR) is a frequency-conversion device used in single-cable distribution systems. It converts signals received from a satellite dish or television antenna into user-defined intermediate frequency (IF) channels, allowing multiple receivers to share a single coaxial cable.

In computer networking, the term cable router may also refer to a network router used with a cable modem. Such devices connect a local area network (LAN) to a broadband cable Internet connection and are often integrated with the modem, providing routing, firewall, proxy, or gateway functions.

== See also ==
- Cable/DSL router
