= IPv4 =

Fourth version of the Internet Protocol

Internet Protocol version 4
- Communication protocol
- IPv4 packet
- Abbreviation: IPv4
- Purpose: Internetworking protocol
- Developer: DARPA
- Introduction: 1980; 46 years ago
- Influenced: IPv6
- OSI layer: Network layer
- RFCs: 760, 791

Internet Protocol version 4 (IPv4) is the first version of the Internet Protocol (IP) as a standalone specification. It is one of the core protocols of standards-based internetworking methods in the Internet and other packet-switched networks. IPv4 was the first version deployed for production on SATNET in 1982 and on the ARPANET in January 1983. It is still used to carry much of the Internet traffic today, even with the ongoing deployment of Internet Protocol version 6 (IPv6), its successor.

IPv4 uses a 32-bit address space which provides 4,294,967,296 (2^{32}) unique addresses, but large blocks are reserved for special networking purposes. This quantity of unique addresses is not large enough to meet the needs of the global Internet, which has caused a significant issue known as IPv4 address exhaustion during the ongoing transition to IPv6.

== Purpose ==
The Internet Protocol (IP) is the protocol that defines and enables internetworking at the internet layer of the Internet Protocol Suite. It gives the Internet a global-scale logical addressing system which allows the routing of IP data packets from a source host to the next router that is one hop closer to the intended destination host on another network.

IPv4 is a connectionless protocol and operates on a best-effort delivery model, in that it does not guarantee delivery, nor does it assure proper sequencing or avoidance of duplicate delivery. These aspects may be addressed by upper layer transport protocols, such as the Transmission Control Protocol (TCP) or the QUIC protocol.

== History ==
Earlier versions of TCP/IP were a combined specification through TCP/IPv3. With IPv4, the Internet Protocol became a separate specification.

Internet Protocol version 4 is described in IETF publication RFC 791 (September 1981), replacing an earlier definition of January 1980 (RFC 760). In March 1982, the US Department of Defense decided on the Internet Protocol Suite (TCP/IP) as the standard for all military computer networking.

=== Address space exhaustion ===
IPv4 address exhaustion timeline

In the late 1980s, it became apparent that the pool of available IPv4 addresses was depleting at a rate that was not initially anticipated in the original design of the network. The main market forces that accelerated address depletion beginning in the 1990s included the rapidly growing number of Internet users, who increasingly used mobile computing devices, such as laptop computers, and personal digital assistants (PDAs), and smart phones with IP data services. In addition, high-speed Internet access was based on always-on devices. The threat of exhaustion motivated the introduction of a number of remedial technologies, such as:

- Classless Inter-Domain Routing (CIDR), for smaller ISP allocations
- Unnumbered interfaces removed the need for addresses on transit links.
- Network address translation (NAT) removed the need for the end-to-end principle.

By the mid-1990s, NAT was used pervasively in network access provider systems, along with strict usage-based allocation policies at the regional and local Internet registries.

The primary address pool of the Internet, maintained by IANA, was exhausted on 3 February 2011, when the last five blocks were allocated to the five RIRs. APNIC was the first RIR to exhaust its regional pool on 15 April 2011, except for a small amount of address space reserved for the transition technologies to IPv6, which is to be allocated under a restricted policy.

The long-term solution to address exhaustion was the 1998 specification of a new version of the Internet Protocol, IPv6. It provides a vastly increased address space, but also allows improved route aggregation across the Internet, and offers large subnetwork allocations of a minimum of 2^{64} host addresses to end users. However, IPv4 is not directly interoperable with IPv6, so IPv4-only hosts cannot directly communicate with IPv6-only hosts. With the phase-out of the 6bone experimental network starting in 2004, permanent formal deployment of IPv6 commenced in 2006. Completion of IPv6 deployment is expected to take considerable time, so that intermediate transition technologies are necessary to permit hosts to participate in the Internet using both versions of the protocol.

== Addressing ==
Decomposition of the quad-dotted IPv4 address representation to its binary value

IPv4 uses 32-bit addresses which limits the address space to 4294967296 (2^{32}) addresses.

IPv4 reserves special address blocks for private networks (2^{24} + 2^{20} + 2^{16} ≈ 18 million addresses) and multicast addresses (2^{28} ≈ 268 million addresses).

=== Address representations ===
IPv4 addresses may be represented in any notation expressing a 32-bit integer value. They are most often written in dot-decimal notation, which consists of four octets of the address expressed individually in decimal numbers (without any extra leading zeros) and separated by periods.

For example, the quad-dotted IP address in the illustration (172.16.254.1) represents the 32-bit decimal number 2886794753, which in hexadecimal format is 0xAC10FE01.

CIDR notation combines the address with its routing prefix in a compact format, in which the address is followed by a slash character (/) and the count of leading consecutive 1 bits in the routing prefix (subnet mask).

Other address representations were in common use when classful networking was practiced. For example, the loopback address 127.0.0.1 was commonly written as 127.1, given that it belongs to a class-A network with eight bits for the network mask and 24 bits for the host number. When fewer than four numbers were specified in the address in dotted notation, the last value was treated as an integer of as many bytes as are required to fill out the address to four octets. Thus, the address 127.65530 is equivalent to 127.0.255.250.

=== Allocation ===
In the original design of IPv4, an IP address was divided into two parts: the network identifier was the most significant octet of the address, and the host identifier was the rest of the address. The latter was also called the rest field. This structure permitted a maximum of 256 network identifiers, which was quickly found to be inadequate.

To overcome this limit, the most-significant address octet was redefined in 1981 to create network classes, in a system which later became known as classful networking. The revised system defined five classes. Classes A, B, and C had different bit lengths for network identification. The rest of the address was used as previously to identify a host within a network. Because of the different sizes of fields in different classes, each network class had a different capacity for addressing hosts. In addition to the three classes for addressing hosts, Class D was defined for multicast addressing, and Class E was reserved for future applications.

Dividing existing classful networks into subnets began in 1985 with the publication of RFC 950. This division was made more flexible with the introduction of variable-length subnet masks (VLSM) in RFC 1109 in 1987. In 1993, based on this work, RFC 1517 introduced Classless Inter-Domain Routing (CIDR), which expressed the number of bits (from the most significant) as, for instance, /24, and the class-based scheme was dubbed classful, by contrast. CIDR was designed to permit repartitioning of any address space so that smaller or larger blocks of addresses could be allocated to users. The hierarchical structure created by CIDR is managed by the Internet Assigned Numbers Authority (IANA) and the regional Internet registries (RIRs). Each RIR maintains a publicly searchable WHOIS database that provides information about IP address assignments.

=== Special-use addresses ===
The Internet Engineering Task Force (IETF) and IANA have restricted from general use various reserved IP addresses for special purposes. Notably these addresses are used for multicast traffic and to provide addressing space for unrestricted uses on private networks.

Special address blocks
Address block (CIDR)	Address range	Number of addresses	Scope	Description
0.0.0.0/8	0.0.0.0–0.255.255.255	16777216	Software	Current (local, "this") network
10.0.0.0/8	10.0.0.0–10.255.255.255	16777216	Private network	Used for local communications within a private network
100.64.0.0/10	100.64.0.0–100.127.255.255	4194304	Private network	Shared address space for communications between a service provider and its subscribers when using a carrier-grade NAT
127.0.0.0/8	127.0.0.0–127.255.255.255	16777216	Host	Used for loopback addresses to the localhost
169.254.0.0/16	169.254.0.0–169.254.255.255	65536	Subnet	Used for link-local addresses between two hosts on a single link when no IP address is otherwise specified, such as would have normally been retrieved from a DHCP server
172.16.0.0/12	172.16.0.0–172.31.255.255	1048576	Private network	Used for local communications within a private network
192.0.0.0/24	192.0.0.0–192.0.0.255	256	Private network	IETF Protocol Assignments, sub-assignments are made for specific use cases, such as IPv6 transition
192.0.2.0/24	192.0.2.0–192.0.2.255	256	Documentation	Assigned as TEST-NET-1, documentation and examples
192.88.99.0/24	192.88.99.0–192.88.99.255	256	Internet	Reserved. Formerly used for IPv6 to IPv4 relay (included IPv6 address block 2002::/16).
192.168.0.0/16	192.168.0.0–192.168.255.255	65536	Private network	Used for local communications within a private network
198.18.0.0/15	198.18.0.0–198.19.255.255	131072	Private network	Used for benchmark testing of inter-network communications between two separate subnets
198.51.100.0/24	198.51.100.0–198.51.100.255	256	Documentation	Assigned as TEST-NET-2, documentation and examples
203.0.113.0/24	203.0.113.0–203.0.113.255	256	Documentation	Assigned as TEST-NET-3, documentation and examples
224.0.0.0/4	224.0.0.0–239.255.255.255	268435456	Internet	In use for multicast (former Class D network)
233.252.0.0/24	233.252.0.0–233.252.0.255	256	Documentation	Assigned as MCAST-TEST-NET, documentation and examples (This is part of the above multicast space.)
240.0.0.0/4	240.0.0.0–255.255.255.254	268435455	Internet	Reserved for future use (former Class E network)
255.255.255.255/32	255.255.255.255	1	Subnet	Reserved for the "limited broadcast" destination address

==== Private networks ====
Of the approximately four billion addresses defined in IPv4, about 18 million addresses from three ranges are reserved for use in private networks as outlined by RFC 1918. Packets with addresses in these ranges are not routable in the public Internet; they are ignored by all public routers. Therefore, private hosts cannot directly communicate with public networks, but require network address translation at a routing gateway for this purpose.

Reserved private IPv4 network ranges
Name	CIDR block	Address range	Number of addresses	Classful description
24-bit block	10.0.0.0/8	10.0.0.0 – 10.255.255.255	16777216	Single Class A
20-bit block	172.16.0.0/12	172.16.0.0 – 172.31.255.255	1048576	Contiguous range of 16 Class B blocks
16-bit block	192.168.0.0/16	192.168.0.0 – 192.168.255.255	65536	Contiguous range of 256 Class C blocks

Since two private networks, e.g., two branch offices, cannot directly interoperate via the public Internet, the two networks must be bridged across the Internet via a virtual private network (VPN) or an IP tunnel, which encapsulates packets, including their headers containing the private addresses, in a protocol layer during transmission across the public network. Additionally, encapsulated packets may be encrypted for transmission across public networks to secure the data.

==== Special-purpose addresses ====
IANA has reserved the address block 192.0.0.0/24 for special assignments. The following assignments from this block currently exist:

- 192.0.0.0/29 — IPv4 Service Continuity Prefix, used for IPv6 transition mechanisms such as DS-Lite and 464XLAT
- 192.0.0.8/32 — IPv4 dummy address, used as a synthetic IPv4 source address in the 4rd transition mechanism
- 192.0.0.9/32 — Port Control Protocol Anycast
- 192.0.0.10/32 — Traversal Using Relays around NAT Anycast
- 192.0.0.11/32 (Draft) — Use IPv6 Neighbor Discovery as the Default Gateway
- 192.0.0.170/32, 192.0.0.171/32 — NAT64/DNS64 Discovery. Allows a client to discover the presence of DNS64 by querying its recursive DNS resolver for the domain ipv4only.arpa

Furthermore, IANA has reserved the following two IPv4 prefixes for AS112 nameserver operations:

- 192.175.48.0/24 — Blackhole servers with the traditional authoritative zones configured
- 192.31.196.0/24 — Blackhole servers for the new blackholing approach involving DNAME records to empty.as112.arpa

=== Link-local addressing ===
RFC 3927 defines the special address block 169.254.0.0/16 for link-local addressing. These addresses are only valid on the link (such as a local network segment or point-to-point connection) directly connected to a host that uses them. These addresses are not routable. Like private addresses, these addresses cannot be the source or destination of packets traversing the Internet. These addresses are primarily used for address autoconfiguration (Zeroconf) when a host cannot obtain an IP address from a DHCP server or other internal configuration methods.

When the address block was reserved, no standards existed for address autoconfiguration. Microsoft created an implementation called Automatic Private IP Addressing (APIPA), which was deployed on millions of machines and became a de facto standard. Many years later, in May 2005, the IETF defined a formal standard in RFC 3927, entitled Dynamic Configuration of IPv4 Link-Local Addresses.

=== Loopback ===
The class A network 127.0.0.0 (classless network 127.0.0.0/8) is reserved for loopback. IP packets whose source addresses belong to this network should never appear outside a host. Packets received on a non-loopback interface with a loopback source or destination address must be dropped.

=== First and last subnet addresses ===
In every subnet, both the all-zeros and all-ones host addresses are reserved. The all-zeros host address is used to identify a given subnet. The highest address of every subnet, with all host bits set to 1, is the local broadcast address for sending messages to all devices on the subnet simultaneously. For networks of size /24 or larger, the broadcast address in dot-decimal notation always ends in 255.

For example, in the subnet 192.168.5.0/24 (subnet mask 255.255.255.0) the identifier 192.168.5.0 is used to refer to the entire subnet. The broadcast address of the network is 192.168.5.255.

Type	Binary form	Dot-decimal notation
Network space	11000000.10101000.00000101.00000000	192.168.5.0
Broadcast address	11000000.10101000.00000101.11111111	192.168.5.255
In red is shown the host part of the IP address; the other part is the network prefix. The host gets inverted (logical NOT), but the network prefix remains intact.

However, this does not mean that every address ending in 0 or 255 cannot be used as a host address. For example, in the /16 subnet 192.168.0.0/255.255.0.0, which is equivalent to the address range 192.168.0.0–192.168.255.255, the broadcast address is 192.168.255.255. One can use the following addresses for hosts, even though they end with 255: 192.168.1.255, 192.168.2.255, etc. Also, 192.168.0.0 is the network identifier and must not be assigned to an interface. The addresses 192.168.1.0, 192.168.2.0, etc., may be assigned, despite ending with 0.

In the past, conflict between network addresses and broadcast addresses arose because some software used non-standard broadcast addresses with zeros instead of ones.

In networks smaller than /24, broadcast addresses do not necessarily end with 255. For example, a CIDR subnet 203.0.113.16/28 has the broadcast address 203.0.113.31.

Type	Binary form	Dot-decimal notation
Network space	11001011.00000000.01110001.00010000	203.0.113.16
Broadcast address	11001011.00000000.01110001.00011111	203.0.113.31
In red, is shown the host part of the IP address; the other part is the network prefix. The host gets inverted (logical NOT), but the network prefix remains intact.

As a special case, a /31 network has capacity for just two hosts. These networks are typically used for point-to-point connections. There is no network identifier or broadcast address for these networks.

=== Address resolution ===
Hosts on the Internet are usually known by names, e.g., www.example.com, not primarily by their IP address, which is used for routing and network interface identification. The use of domain names requires translating, called resolving, them to addresses and vice versa. This is analogous to looking up a phone number in a phone book using the recipient's name.

The translation between addresses and domain names is performed by the Domain Name System (DNS), a hierarchical, distributed naming system that allows for the subdelegation of namespaces to other DNS servers.

=== Unnumbered interface ===
An unnumbered point-to-point (PtP) link, also called a transit link, is a link that does not have an IP network or subnet number associated with it, but still has an IP address. First introduced in 1993, Phil Karn from Qualcomm is credited as the original designer.

The purpose of a transit link is to route datagrams. They are used to free IP addresses from a scarce IP address space or to reduce the management of assigning IP and configuration of interfaces. Previously, every link needed to dedicate a /31 or /30 subnet using 2 or 4 IP addresses per point-to-point link. When a link is unnumbered, a router-id is used, a single IP address borrowed from a defined (normally a loopback) interface. The same router-id can be used on multiple interfaces.

One of the disadvantages of unnumbered interfaces is that it is harder to do remote testing and management.

== Packet structure ==
An IP packet consists of a header section and a data section. An IP packet has no data checksum or any other footer after the data section. Typically, the link layer encapsulates IP packets in frames with a CRC footer that detects most errors. Many transport-layer protocols carried by IP also have their own error checking.

=== Header ===
The IPv4 packet header consists of 14 fields, of which 13 are required. The 14th field is optional and aptly named: options. The fields in the header are packed with the most significant byte first (network byte order), and for the diagram and discussion, the most significant bits are considered to come first (MSB 0 bit numbering). The most significant bit is numbered 0, so the version field is actually found in the four most significant bits of the first byte, for example.

IPv4 header format
Offset	Octet	0								1								2								3							
Octet	Bit	0	1	2	3	4	5	6	7	8	9	10	11	12	13	14	15	16	17	18	19	20	21	22	23	24	25	26	27	28	29	30	31
0	0	Version (4)				IHL				DSCP						ECN		Total Length															
4	32	Identification																Flags			Fragment Offset												
8	64	Time to Live								Protocol								Header Checksum															
12	96	Source address																															
16	128	Destination address																															
20	160	(Options) (if IHL > 5)																															
⋮	⋮	(Options) (if IHL > 5)																															
56	448	(Options) (if IHL > 5)																															

Version: 4 bits
The first header field in an IP packet is the Version field. For IPv4, this is always equal to 4.
Internet Header Length (IHL): 4 bits
The IPv4 header is variable in size due to the optional 14th field (Options). The IHL field contains the size of the IPv4 header; it has 4 bits that specify the number of 32-bit words in the header. The minimum value for this field is 5, which indicates a length of 5 × 32 bits = 160 bits = 20 bytes. As a 4-bit field, the maximum value is 15; this means that the maximum size of the IPv4 header is 15 × 32 bits = 480 bits = 60 bytes.
Differentiated Services Code Point (DSCP): 6 bits
Originally defined as the type of service (ToS), this field specifies differentiated services (DiffServ). Real-time data streaming makes use of the DSCP field. An example is Voice over IP (VoIP), which is used for interactive voice services.
Explicit Congestion Notification (ECN): 2 bits
This field allows end-to-end notification of network congestion without dropping packets. ECN is an optional feature available when both endpoints support it and effective when also supported by the underlying network.
Total Length: 16 bits
This 16-bit field defines the entire packet size in bytes, including header and data. The minimum size is 20 bytes (header without data) and the maximum is 65,535 bytes. All hosts are required to be able to reassemble datagrams of size up to 576 bytes, but most modern hosts handle much larger packets. Links may impose further restrictions on the packet size, in which case datagrams must be fragmented. Fragmentation in IPv4 is performed in either the sending host or in routers. Reassembly is performed at the receiving host.
Identification: 16 bits
This field is an identification field and is primarily used for uniquely identifying the group of fragments of a single IP datagram. Some experimental work has suggested using the ID field for other purposes, such as for adding packet-tracing information to help trace datagrams with spoofed source addresses, but any such use is now prohibited.
Flags: 3 bits
There are three flags defined within this field.

Reserved (R): 1 bit

Reserved. Should be set to 0. (Note: As an April Fools' joke, proposed for use in RFC 3514 as the "Evil bit")

Don't Fragment (DF): 1 bit

This field specifies whether the datagram can be fragmented or not. This can be used when sending packets to a host that does not have resources to perform reassembly of fragments. It can also be used for path MTU discovery, either automatically by the host IP software, or manually using diagnostic tools such as ping or traceroute. If the DF flag is set, and fragmentation is required to route the packet, then the packet is dropped.

More Fragments (MF): 1 bit

For unfragmented packets, the MF flag is cleared. For fragmented packets, all fragments except the last have the MF flag set. The last fragment has a non-zero Fragment Offset field, so it can still be differentiated from an unfragmented packet.
Fragment Offset: 13 bits
This field specifies the offset of a particular fragment relative to the beginning of the original unfragmented IP datagram. Fragments are specified in units of 8 bytes, which is why fragment lengths are always a multiple of 8; except the last, which may be smaller.
The fragmentation offset value for the first fragment is always 0. The field is 13 bits wide, so the offset value ranges from 0 to 8191 (from (2^{0} – 1) to (2^{13} – 1)). Therefore, it allows a maximum fragment offset of (2^{13} – 1) × 8 = 65,528 bytes, with the header length included (65,528 + 20 = 65,548 bytes), supporting fragmentation of packets exceeding the maximum IP length of 65,535 bytes.
Time to live (TTL): 8 bits
The time to live field limits a datagram's lifetime to prevent network failure in the event of a routing loop. It is specified in seconds, but time intervals less than 1 second are rounded up to 1. In practice, the field is used as a hop count—when the datagram arrives at a router, the router decrements the TTL field by one. When the TTL field hits zero, the router discards the packet and typically sends an ICMP time exceeded message to the sender.
The program traceroute sends messages with adjusted TTL values and uses these ICMP time exceeded messages to identify the routers traversed by packets from the source to the destination.
Protocol: 8 bits
This field identifies the protocol encapsulated in the data portion of the IP datagram. The list of IP protocol numbers is maintained by Internet Assigned Numbers Authority (IANA).
Some of the common payload protocols include:

Protocol Number	Protocol Name	Abbreviation
1	Internet Control Message Protocol	ICMP
2	Internet Group Management Protocol	IGMP
6	Transmission Control Protocol	TCP
17	User Datagram Protocol	UDP
41	IPv6 encapsulation	ENCAP
89	Open Shortest Path First	OSPF
132	Stream Control Transmission Protocol	SCTP

Header Checksum: 16 bits
The IPv4 header checksum field is used for error checking of the header. Before sending a packet, the checksum is computed as the 16-bit ones' complement of the ones' complement sum of all 16-bit words in the header. This includes the Header Checksum field itself, which is set to zero during computation. The packet is sent with Header Checksum containing the resulting value. When a packet arrives at a router or its destination, the network device recalculates the checksum value of the header, now including the Header Checksum field. The result should be zero; if a different result is obtained, the device discards the packet.
When a packet arrives at a router, the router decreases the TTL field in the header. Consequently, the router must calculate a new header checksum before sending it out again.
Errors in the data portion of the packet are handled separately by the encapsulated protocol. Both UDP and TCP have separate checksums that apply to their data.
Source address: 32 bits
This field contains the IPv4 address of the sender of the packet. It may be changed in transit by network address translation (NAT).
Destination address: 32 bits
This field contains the IPv4 address of the intended receiver of the packet. It may also be affected by NAT.
If the destination can be reached directly the packet will be delivered by the underlying link layer, with the help of ARP. If not, the packet needs routing and will be delivered to gateway address instead.
Options: 0 - 320 bits, padded to multiples of 32 bits
The Options field is not often used. Packets containing some options may be considered as dangerous by some routers and be blocked. The value in the IHL field must include sufficient extra 32-bit words to hold all options and any padding needed to ensure that the header contains an integral number of 32-bit words. If IHL is greater than 5 (i.e., it is from 6 to 15) it means that the options field is present and must be considered. The list of options may be terminated with the option EOOL (End of Options List, 0x00); this is only necessary if the end of the options would not otherwise coincide with the end of the header.
Since most of the IP options include specifications on how many or which intermediate devices the packet should pass, the IP options are not used for communication over the Internet and IP packets including some of the IP options must be dropped, since they can expose the network topology or network details.

== Fragmentation and reassembly ==
The Internet Protocol enables traffic between networks. The design accommodates networks of diverse physical nature; it is independent of the underlying transmission technology used in the link layer. Networks with different hardware usually vary not only in transmission speed, but also in the maximum transmission unit (MTU). When one network wants to transmit datagrams to a network with a smaller MTU, it may fragment its datagrams. In IPv4, this function was placed at the Internet Layer and is performed in IPv4 routers, limiting exposure to these issues by hosts.

In contrast, IPv6, the next generation of the Internet Protocol, does not allow routers to perform fragmentation; hosts must perform Path MTU Discovery before sending datagrams.

=== Fragmentation ===
When a router receives a packet, it examines the destination address and determines the outgoing interface to use and that interface's MTU. If the packet size is bigger than the MTU, and the Do not Fragment (DF) bit in the packet's header is set to 0, then the router may fragment the packet.

The router divides the payload into fragments. The maximum size of each fragment is the outgoing MTU minus the IP header size (20 bytes minimum; 60 bytes maximum). The router puts each fragment into its own packet, each fragment packet having the following changes:

- The total length field is the fragment size + header length.
- The more fragments (MF) flag is set for all fragments except the last one, which is set to 0.
- The fragment offset field is set, based on the offset of the fragment in the original data payload. This is measured in units of 8-byte blocks.
- The header checksum field is recomputed.

For example, for an MTU of 1,500 bytes and a header size of 20 bytes, the fragment offsets would be multiples of $\frac{1{,}500-20}{8}=185$ (0, 185, 370, 555, 740, etc.).

It is possible that a packet is fragmented at one router and that the fragments are further fragmented at another router. For example, a packet of 4,520 bytes, including a 20-byte IP header, is fragmented to two packets on a link with an MTU of 2,500 bytes:

Fragment	Size (bytes)	Header size (bytes)	Data size (bytes)	Flag More fragments	Fragment offset (8-byte blocks)
1	2,500	20	2,480	1	0
2	2,040	20	2,020	0	310

The total data size is preserved: 2,480 bytes + 2,020 bytes = 4,500 bytes. The offsets are $0$ and $\frac{0+2{,}480}{8}=310$.

When forwarded to a link with an MTU of 1,500 bytes, each fragment is fragmented into two fragments:

Fragment	Size (bytes)	Header size (bytes)	Data size (bytes)	Flag More fragments	Fragment offset (8-byte blocks)
1	1,500	20	1,480	1	0
2	1,020	20	1,000	1	185
3	1,500	20	1,480	1	310
4	560	20	540	0	495

Again, the data size is preserved: 1,480 + 1,000 = 2,480, and 1,480 + 540 = 2,020.

Also in this case, the More Fragments bit remains 1 for all the fragments that came with 1 in them, and for the last fragment that arrives, it works as usual, that is, the MF bit is set to 0 only in the last one. And of course, the Identification field continues to have the same value in all re-fragmented fragments. This way, even if fragments are re-fragmented, the receiver knows they have initially all started from the same packet.

The last offset and last data size are used to calculate the total data size: $495 \times 8+540=3{,}960+540=4{,}500$.

=== Reassembly ===
A receiver knows that a packet is a fragment if at least one of the following conditions is true:

- The flag more fragments is set, which is true for all fragments except the last.
- The field fragment offset is nonzero, which is true for all fragments except the first.

The receiver identifies matching fragments using the source and destination addresses, the protocol ID, and the identification field. The receiver reassembles the data from fragments with the same ID using both the fragment offset and the more fragments flag. When the receiver receives the last fragment, which has the more fragments flag set to 0, it can calculate the size of the original data payload by multiplying the last fragment's offset by eight and adding the last fragment's data size. In the given example, this calculation was $495 \times 8+540=4{,}500$ bytes. When the receiver has all fragments, they can be reassembled in the correct sequence according to the offsets to form the original datagram.

== Assistive protocols ==
IP addresses are not tied in any permanent manner to networking hardware and, indeed, in modern operating systems, a network interface can have multiple IP addresses. In order to properly deliver an IP packet to the destination host on a link, hosts and routers need additional mechanisms to make an association between the hardware address (Note: For IEEE 802 networking technologies, including Ethernet, the hardware address is a MAC address.) of network interfaces and IP addresses. The Address Resolution Protocol (ARP) performs this IP-address-to-hardware-address translation for IPv4. In addition, the reverse correlation is often necessary. For example, unless an address is preconfigured by an administrator, when an IP host is booted or connected to a network, it needs to determine its IP address. Protocols for such reverse correlations include Dynamic Host Configuration Protocol (DHCP), Bootstrap Protocol (BOOTP) and, infrequently, reverse ARP.

== See also ==
- History of the Internet
- List of assigned /8 IPv4 address blocks
