= Loopback =

Routing of signals back to their source

Loopback (also written loop-back) is the routing of electronic signals or digital data streams back to their source without intentional processing or modification. It is primarily a means of testing the communications infrastructure.

Loopback can take the form of communication channels with only one communication endpoint. Any message transmitted by such a channel is immediately and only received by that same channel. In telecommunications, loopback devices perform transmission tests of access lines from the serving switching center, which usually does not require the assistance of personnel at the served terminal. Loop around is a method of testing between stations that are not necessarily adjacent, wherein two lines are used, with the test being done at one station and the two lines are interconnected at the distant station. A patch cable may also function as loopback, when applied manually or automatically, remotely or locally, facilitating a loop-back test.

Where a system (such as a modem) involves round-trip analog-to-digital processing, a distinction is made between analog loopback, where the analog signal is looped back directly, and digital loopback, where the signal is processed in the digital domain before being re-converted to an analog signal and returned to the source.

== Telecommunications ==
In telecommunications, loopback, or a loop, is a hardware or software method which feeds a received signal or data back to the sender. It is used as an aid in debugging physical connection problems. As a test, many data communication devices can be configured to send specific patterns (such as all ones) on an interface and can detect the reception of this signal on the same port. This is called a loopback test and can be performed within a modem or transceiver by connecting its output to its own input. A circuit between two points in different locations may be tested by applying a test signal on the circuit in one location, and having the network device at the other location send a signal back through the circuit. If this device receives its own signal back, this proves that the circuit is functioning.

A hardware loop is a simple device that physically connects the receiver channel to the transmitter channel. In the case of a network termination connector such as X.21, this is typically done by simply connecting the pins together in the connector. Media such as optical fiber or coaxial cable, which have separate transmit and receive connectors, can simply be looped together with a single strand of the appropriate medium.

A modem can be configured to loop incoming signals from either the remote modem or the local terminal. This is referred to as loopback or software loop.

== Serial interfaces ==
A serial communications transceiver can use loopback for testing its functionality. For example, a device's transmit pin connected to its receive pin will result in the device receiving exactly what it transmits. Moving this looping connection to the remote end of a cable adds the cable to this test. Moving it to the far end of a modem link extends the test further. This is a common troubleshooting technique and is often combined with a specialized test device that sends specific patterns and counts any errors that come back (see Bit Error Rate Test). Some devices include built-in loopback capability.

A simple serial interface loopback test, called paperclip test, is sometimes used to identify serial ports of a computer and verify operation. It utilizes a terminal emulator application to send characters, with flow control set to off, to the serial port and receive the same back. For this purpose, a paperclip is used to short pin 2 to pin 3 (the receive and transmit pins) on a standard RS-232 interface using D-subminiature DE-9 or DB-25 connectors.

== Virtual loopback interface ==
Implementations of the Internet protocol suite include a virtual network interface through which network applications can communicate when executing on the same machine. It is implemented entirely within the operating system's networking software and passes no packets to any network interface controller. Any traffic that a computer program sends to a loopback IP address is simply and immediately passed back up the network software stack as if it had been received from another device. Unix-like systems usually name this loopback interface lo or lo0.

Various Internet Engineering Task Force (IETF) standards reserve the IPv4 address block 127.0.0.0/8, in CIDR notation and the IPv6 address ::1/128 for this purpose. The most common IPv4 address used is 127.0.0.1. Commonly these loopback addresses are mapped to the hostnames localhost or loopback.

=== MPLS ===
An exceptional (non-loopback) use of 127.0.0.0/8 network addresses is in Multiprotocol Label Switching (MPLS) traceroute error detection, in which their property of not being routable provides a convenient means to avoid delivery of faulty packets to end users.

=== Martian packets ===
Any IP datagram with a source or destination address set to a loopback address must not appear outside of a computing system, or be routed by any routing device. Packets received on an interface with a loopback destination address must be dropped. Such packets are sometimes referred to as Martian packets. As with other bogus packets, they may be malicious and any problems they might cause can be avoided by applying bogon filtering.

=== Management interface ===
Some computer network equipment use the term "loopback" for a virtual interface used for management purposes. Unlike a proper loopback interface, this type of loopback device is not used to talk with itself.

Such an interface is assigned an address that can be accessed from management equipment over a network but is not assigned to any of the physical interfaces on the device. Such a loopback device is also used for management datagrams, such as alarms, originating from the equipment. The property that makes this virtual interface special is that applications that use it will send or receive traffic using the address assigned to the virtual interface as opposed to the address on the physical interface through which the traffic passes.

Loopback interfaces of this sort are often used in the operation of routing protocols, because they have the useful property that, unlike real physical interfaces, they will not go down when a physical port fails.

== Other applications ==
The audio systems Open Sound System (OSS), Advanced Linux Sound Architecture (ALSA) and PulseAudio have loopback modules for recording the audio output of applications for testing purposes. Unlike physical loopbacks, this does not involve double analog/digital conversion and no disruption is caused by hardware malfunctions.

== See also ==
- Feedback
- Loop device
- Virtual network interface
