= PDM =

PDM may stand for:

== Computing ==
- .pdm (disambiguation), several file formats
- Personal data manager - portable hardware tool enabling secure storage and easy access to user data
- Phase dispersion minimization, a data analysis technique for finding periodic components in time series data
- Physical data model, a representation of a data design as implemented, or intended to be implemented, in a database management system
- Point distribution model, deformable contour model (used in Computer Vision)
- Programming Development Manager
- Protocol-dependent module, decision making about routing table entries
- Pulse-density modulation, a form of modulation used in analog to digital conversions
- Product Data Management, Product data management (PDM) or Product information management (PIM) is the business function often within product lifecycle management (PLM)

== Politics ==
- Pichda Dalit Muslmaan is a political alliance in Uttar Pradesh state of India
- Democratic Party of Moldova, a political party of Moldova
- Modern Democratic Party, a political party of Moldova
- Mexican Democratic Party a former political party in Mexico
- Pakistan Democratic Movement, a former anti-establishment coalition of political parties in Pakistan
- Party-directed mediation, a mediation approach that relies heavily on pre-caucus and joint sessions
- People's Democratic Movement, a political party of Papua New Guinea
- People's Democratic Movement (Dominica), a political party of Dominica
- People's Democratic Movement (Montserrat), a political party of Montserrat
- People's Democratic Movement (Turks and Caicos Islands), a political party of the Turks and Caicos Islands
- Popular Democratic Movement, Namibian political party
- Progress and Modern Democracy, French centrist political group
- Southern Democratic Party a former political party in Calabria, Italy

== Others ==
- École Polyvalente Deux-Montagnes, a high school in Deux-Montagnes, Quebec, Canada
- Partial-propensity direct method, a stochastic simulation algorithm for chemical reaction networks
- PDM (cycling team), the cycling team sponsored by Philips Dupont Magnetics
- PDM Group of Institutions (popularly known as PDM) is a Group of Educational Institutions located in India
- Penny-drop moment, an abbreviation used by cryptic crossword bloggers
- Philips Dupont Magnetics, a joint venture between Philips and DuPont
- Ponta da Madeira, an enormous deep-water port in northern Brazil
- Polarization-division multiplexing
- Post-detonation material such as trinitite formed following nuclear weapon detonations
- Prague Daily Monitor, a newspaper published in the Czech Republic
- Preachers of Divine Mercy, a Syro-Malabar Catholic religious congregation
- Precedence Diagram Method, a project scheduling technique
- Predictive maintenance, a method for planning equipment maintenance based on their condition
- Public Domain Mark, a way of distinguishing works that are free of known copyright
- Psychodynamic Diagnostic Manual, a psychoanalytically-oriented manual for use by mental health professionals
- PDM-A, modernized version of the RPO-A reactive flamethrower
- M86 pursuit deterrent munition, a type of anti-personnel mine produced in US
- Personal diabetes manager a machine used for giving insulin to diabetics
- Parfums de Marly, a French niche perfume house.
- Pittsburgh-Des Moines Steel Company, a defunct United States steel fabrication company
