= Fuzzy routing =

Approach to computer routing

Fuzzy routing is the application of fuzzy logic to routing protocols, particularly in the context of ad-hoc wireless networks and in networks supporting multiple quality of service classes. It is currently the subject of research.

== See also ==
- Dynamic routing
- List of ad hoc routing protocols
