= Deflection =

Deflection or deflexion may refer to:

== Board games ==
- Deflection (chess), a tactic that forces an opposing chess piece to leave a square
- Khet (game), formerly Deflexion, an Egyptian-themed chess-like game using lasers

== Mechanics ==
- Deflection (ballistics), shooting ahead of a moving target so that the target and projectile will collide
- Deflection (engineering), the displacement of a structural element under load
- Deflection (physics), the event where an object collides and bounces against a plane surface

== Social sciences ==
- Deflexion (linguistics), the degeneration of a language's inflectional system over time
- Deflection (psychology), a defence mechanism

== Technologies ==
- Deflection routing, a routing strategy for networks to reduce the need of buffering packets
- Deflection yoke, a kind of magnetic lens used in cathode ray tubes
- Electrostatic deflection, a technique for modifying the path of charged particles by the use of an electric field
- Deflect.ca, a DDoS mitigation and website security service

== See also ==
- Deflector (disambiguation)
