= ODR =

ODR or Odr may refer to:

- Octal data rate, a technique used in high-speed computer memory
- Oculomotor delayed response, a task used in neuroscience.
- Óðr
- Office for dispute resolution
- On Demand Routing
- One Day Remains
- One Definition Rule
- One-drop rule
- Online dispute resolution
- Operator Driven Reliability - A field maintenance concept which is implemented in ODR programs
- Orthogonal distance regression
- Outdoor ice rink
- Owner-driven reconstruction, in natural disaster recovery
