= Cisco Discovery Protocol =

Proprietary data link network protocol

- Communication protocol
- Abbreviation: CDP
- Developer(s): Cisco Systems
- Introduction: 1994; 32 years ago
- OSI layer: Data link layer

Cisco Discovery Protocol (CDP) is a proprietary data link layer protocol developed by Cisco Systems in 1994 by Keith McCloghrie and Dino Farinacci. It is used to share information about other directly connected Cisco equipment, such as the operating system version and IP address. CDP can also be used for On-Demand Routing, which is a method of including routing information in CDP announcements so that dynamic routing protocols do not need to be used in simple networks.

== Operation ==
Cisco devices send CDP announcements to the destination MAC address 01:00:0c:cc:cc:cc, out each connected network interface. These multicast frames may be received by Cisco switches and other networking devices that support CDP on their connected network interface. This multicast destination is also used in other Cisco protocols such as Virtual Local Area Network (VLAN) Trunking Protocol (VTP). By default, CDP announcements are sent every 60 seconds on interfaces that support Subnetwork Access Protocol (SNAP) headers, including Ethernet, Frame Relay and Asynchronous Transfer Mode (ATM). Each Cisco device that supports CDP stores the information received from other devices in a table that can be viewed using the show cdp neighbors command. This table is also accessible via Simple Network Management Protocol (SNMP). The CDP table information is refreshed each time an announcement is received, and the hold time for that entry is reinitialized. The hold time specifies the lifetime of an entry in the table - if no announcements are received from a device for a period in excess of the hold time, the device information is discarded (default 180 seconds).

The information contained in CDP announcements varies by the type of device and the version of the operating system running on it. This information may include the operating system version, hostname, every address (i.e. IP address) from all protocol(s) configured on the port where CDP frame is sent, the port identifier from which the announcement was sent, device type and model, duplex setting, VTP domain, native VLAN, power draw (for Power over Ethernet devices), and other device specific information. The details contained in these announcements is easily extended due to the use of the type–length–value (TLV) frame format. See external links for a technical definition.

== Support ==
Hewlett-Packard removed support for transmitting CDP from HP ProCurve products shipped after February 2006 and all future software upgrades. Receiving and processing CDP information is still supported. CDP support was replaced with IEEE 802.1AB Link Layer Discovery Protocol (LLDP), an IEEE standard that is implemented by multiple vendors and is functionally similar to CDP.

Several other manufacturers, including Dell and Netgear, have used the brand-neutral name Industry Standard Discovery Protocol (ISDP) to refer to their implementations of a CDP-compatible protocol.

CDP was the abbreviation used by Cabletron who wrote the RFC 2641 for the discovery protocol.

== See also ==
- CDP spoofing
