= Dynamic routing =

Network routing process

In computer networking, dynamic routing (DR), also called adaptive routing (AR), is a process where a router can forward data via a different route for a given destination based on the current conditions of the communication circuits within a system. The term is most commonly associated with data networking to describe the capability of a network to 'route around' damage, such as loss of a node or a connection between nodes, as long as other path choices are available. Dynamic routing allows as many routes as possible to remain valid in response to the change.

Systems that do not implement dynamic routing are described as using static routing, where routes through a network are described by fixed paths. A change, such as the loss of a node, or loss of a connection between nodes, is not compensated for. This means that anything that wishes to take an affected path will either have to wait for the failure to be repaired before restarting its journey, or will have to fail to reach its destination and give up the journey.

== All protocols ==
There are several routing protocols that can be used for dynamic routing. Routing Information Protocol (RIP) is a distance-vector routing protocol that prevents routing loops by implementing a limit on the number of hops allowed in a path from source to destination. Open Shortest Path First (OSPF) uses a link state routing (LSR) algorithm and falls into the group of interior gateway protocols (IGPs). Intermediate System to Intermediate System (IS-IS) determines the best route for data through a packet-switched network. Interior Gateway Routing Protocol (IGRP) and its advanced form Enhanced Interior Gateway Routing Protocol (EIGRP) are used by routers to exchange routing data within an autonomous system.

== Alternate paths ==
Many systems use some next-hop forwarding protocol—when a packet arrives at some node, that node decides on-the-fly which link to use to push the packet one hop closer to its final destination.

Routers that use some adaptive protocols, such as the Spanning Tree Protocol, in order to "avoid bridge loops and routing loops", calculate a tree that indicates the one "best" link for a packet to get to its destination. Alternate "redundant" links not on the tree are temporarily disabled—until one of the links on the main tree fails, and the routers calculate a new tree using those links to route around the broken link.

Routers that use other adaptive protocols, such as grouped adaptive routing, find a group of all the links that could be used to get the packet one hop closer to its final destination. The router sends the packet out any link of that group which is idle. The link aggregation of that group of links effectively becomes a single high-bandwidth connection.

== Outside of computer networks ==
Dynamic routing is found in the brain in relation between sensory and mnemonic signals and decision making, and is a subject of studies in neuroscience.

== See also ==
- Convergence (routing)
- InfiniBand
- Routing in delay-tolerant networking
