= ZHLS-GF =

Hybrid routing protocol

ZHLS-GF (Zone-Based Hierarchical Link State Routing Protocol with Gateway Flooding) is a hybrid routing protocol for computer networks that is based on ZHLS.

In ZHLS, all network nodes construct two routing tables — an intra-zone routing table and an inter-zone routing table — by flooding NodeLSPs within the zone and ZoneLSPs throughout the network. However, this incurs a large communication overhead in the network.

In ZHLS-GF, the flooding scheme floods ZoneLSPs only to the gateway nodes of zones, thus reducing the communication overhead significantly. Further, in ZHLS-GF only the gateway nodes store ZoneLSPs and constructs inter-zone routing tables, meaning that the total storage capacity required in the network is less than in ZHLS.
