= Topology table =

A topology table is used by routers that route traffic in a network. It consists of all routing tables inside the Autonomous System where the router is positioned. Each router using the routing protocol EIGRP then maintains a topology table for each configured network protocol — all routes learned, that are leading to a destination are found in the topology table. EIGRP must have a reliable connection. The routing table of all routers of an Autonomous System is same.
