= Deflection routing =

Packet switching strategy to reduce buffering

Deflection routing is a routing strategy for networks based on packet switching which can reduce the need of buffering packets. Every packet has preferred outputs along which it wants to leave the router, and when possible, a packet is sent along one of these outputs. However, two or more packets may want to leave along the same output (which is referred to as a contention among packets), and then only one of the packets may be sent along the link, while the others are sent along available outputs, even though the other links are not preferred by the packets (because, for instance, those links do not yield shortest paths).

Depending on the rate of incoming packets and the capacity of the outgoing links, deflection routing can work without any packet buffering. Of course, it is always possible to simply drop packets in a network with a best-effort delivery strategy.

== See also ==
- Cut-through switching
- Dynamic Alternative Routing
- Hot-potato routing
