= Collective routing =

Collective routing is routing in which a switching center automatically delivers messages to a specified list of destinations.

Collective routing avoids the need to list each single address in the message heading.

Major relay stations usually transmit messages bearing collective-routing indicators to tributary, minor, and other major relay stations.
