= Deflector =

Deflector may refer to:

- Fire screen
- Jet blast deflector
- Shields (Star Trek)
- Wind deflector

== See also ==
- Deflection (disambiguation)
- Deflektor, a 1987 puzzle video game
