= .pdm =

.pdm is a filename extension for the following programs:

- DeskMate
- PowerDesigner
- Visual Basic (classic)
- Aldus PageMaker

== See also ==
- PDM (disambiguation)
