= Routing in the PSTN =

Process used to route telephone calls across the public switched telephone network

Routing in the PSTN is the process of forwarding telephone calls between the constituent telephone networks that comprise the public switched telephone network (PSTN).

Telephone calls are routed across a network of potentially many switching systems, often owned by different telephone carriers. Switching systems are connected with trunks. Each switch may have many neighbors. Neighboring switches owned by different operators are connected at interconnect points.

The PSTN is a network that uses destination routing to direct calls from origin to the recipient. It is not a full mesh network with the nodes of every operator directly connected to those of every other, which would be impractical and inefficient. Therefore, calls may be routed through intermediate operator networks before they reach their final destination. Efficient least-cost routing is an important procedure in PSTN routing.

== Call routing ==
Each time a call is placed for routing, the destination number (also known as the called party) is entered by the calling party into their terminal. The destination number generally has two parts, an area code which generally identifies the geographical location of the destination telephone, and a telephone number unique within that area code that determines the specific destination terminal. The telephone number may be subdivided into a prefix that may identify a more specific geographic location or a telephone exchange, and the rest of the number. For example, in the number (301) 555-1212, 301 is the area code and 555 is the prefix. (The area code is sometimes known as an "NPA," and the area-code and prefix combination is known as an "NPA-NXX.") In the United States, prior to 2021, in some locations, if the call was between two terminals in the same local area (or, two terminals on the same telephone exchange), then the area code could be omitted. With the introduction in October, 2021 of the national suicide hotline number 988, in most cases, the ability to dial local numbers without the area code was eliminated, and the area code is required for a call to a regular phone number to complete.

When a call is received by an exchange, there are two treatments that may be applied:

- Either the destination terminal is directly connected to that exchange, in which case the call is placed down that connection and the destination terminal rings.
- Or the call must be placed to one of the neighboring exchanges through a connecting trunk for onward routing.

Each exchange in the chain uses pre-computed routing tables to determine which connected exchange the onward call should be routed to. There may be several alternative routes to any given destination, and the exchange can select dynamically between these in the event of link failure or congestion.

The routing tables are generated centrally based on the known topology of the network, the numbering plan, and analysis of traffic data. These are then downloaded to each exchange in the telephone operator's network. Because of the hierarchical nature of the numbering plan, and its geographical basis, most calls between telephone numbers on the same network can be routed based on their area code and prefix using these routing tables.

Some calls, however, cannot be routed on the basis of prefix alone, for example non-geographic numbers such as toll-free or freephone calling. In these cases the Intelligent Network is used to route the call instead of using the pre-computed routing tables.

In determining routing plans, special attention is paid to ensure that two routes do not mutually overflow to each other, otherwise congestion will cause a destination to be completely blocked.

According to Braess's paradox, the addition of a new, shorter, and lower cost route can lead to an increase in overall congestion.

== Hybrid routing ==
Hybrid routing uses numbering plans and routing tables to permit the colocation, in the same area code, of switches using a deterministic routing scheme with switches using a non-deterministic routing scheme, such as flood search routing. Routing tables are constructed with no duplicate numbers, so that direct distance dialing service can be provided to all network subscribers. This may require the use of ten-digit telephone numbers.

== Trunk reservation ==
When congestion causes many calls to use indirect alternative routes that pass through more exchanges than a direct route, the overall capacity of the network is reduced since each of these calls occupies several inter-exchange trunks. Trunk reservation reduces this effect by reserving a fraction of the capacity of each trunk for directly routed calls.

== Dynamic alternative routing ==
Dynamic alternative routing (DAR) is a method of decentralized dynamic routing of telephone calls that uses only a limited amount of local information, which consists of trunk reservation thresholds, or simply knowing the collection of outgoing trunks from the exchange.

A 1989 US patent by British Telecommunications describes dynamic alternative routing as:

A call between two nodes interconnected by a direct link is first offered to the direct route, and if that is blocked it is offered to a currently nominated two-link alternative route between the two nodes. If that route is busy, the call is lost, and a randomly chosen two-link route is assigned to be the new current nominated alternative route.

Thus the chosen route varies to take changing traffic patterns and demands into account. The technique was the subject of Richard Gibbens' doctoral thesis at Cambridge University under Frank Kelly, in collaboration with BT Research, and a British patent was granted in 1985. DAR was implemented in British Telecom's national network in 1996.

== See also ==
- PSTN network topology
- General Toll Switching Plan
- Operator Toll Dialing
