= Routing domain =

Computer networking concept

In computer networking, a routing domain is a collection of networked systems that operate common routing protocols and are under the control of a single administration. For example, this might be a set of routers under the control of a single organization, some of them operating a corporate network, some others a branch office network, and the rest the data center network.

A given autonomous system can contain multiple routing domains, or a set of routing domains can be coordinated without being an Internet-participating autonomous system.
