= Data mule =

Vehicle that physically moves digital storage media between locations

A data mule is a vehicle that physically carries a computer with storage between remote locations to effectively create a data communication link. A data mule is a special case of a sneakernet, where the data is automatically loaded and unloaded when the data mule arrives at its terminal locations. Disruption Tolerant Networking (DTN) can use data mules to exchange data among computers that do not have access to the TCP/IP-based Internet.

Data mules have been used to offer internet connectivity to remote villages. Computers with a disk and wifi link are attached to buses on a bus route between villages. As a bus stops at the village to pick up passengers and cargo, the DTN router on the bus communicates with a DTN router in the bus station over Wi-Fi. Email is down-loaded to the village and up-loaded for transport to the Internet or to other villages along the bus route.

Data mules are a cost-effective mechanism for rural connectivity because they use inexpensive commodity hardware, can be quickly installed, and can be piggy backed on existing transportation infrastructure.

Despite potentially long delays for receiving data, surprisingly large bandwidths can be achieved. For example, delivering a 1 TB disk once per day has an effective bandwidth of 100 Mbit/s.

The term data mule is likely based on the use of the term mule in smuggling, but the backronym MULE (Mobile Ubiquitous LAN Extension) is also claimed to be the source.
