= Next Hop Resolution Protocol =

The Next Hop Resolution Protocol (NHRP) is an extension of the ATM ARP routing mechanism that is sometimes used to improve the efficiency of routing computer network traffic over a non-broadcast, multiple access (NBMA) network. It is defined in IETF RFC 2332, and further described in RFC 2333. It can be used by a sender to determine a route with the fewest hops to a receiver. The protocol differs from ARP-type protocols in that it allows routing optimization across multiple IP subnets. NHRP is implemented by means of next-hop servers across IP subnets.

NHRP forms a part of the Multiprotocol Encapsulation over ATM (MPOA) protocol as described in RFC 2684. It also plays a role in Cisco's Dynamic Multipoint Virtual Private Network. A limitation of NHRP is its inability to improve multicast protocols.

== Description ==
From RFC 2332: "[NHRP] allows a source station (a host or router), wishing to communicate over [an NBMA] subnetwork, to determine the internetworking layer addresses and NBMA addresses of suitable 'NBMA next hops' toward a destination station."
