= Syro-Malabar Catholic religious congregations =

The religious congregations of the Syro-Malabar Catholic Church are categorised in the Code of Canons of the Eastern Churches as Monasteries, Hermitages, Orders, Congregations, Societies of Common Life in the Manner of Religious, secular institutes and Societies of Apostolic Life.

== Syro-Malabar Institutes for the consecrated ==
=== Men ===
Name	Type	Head	Established (By/Year)	Remarks
=== Pontifical Right ===
Carmelites of Mary Immaculate (CMI)	Religious Congregation	Fr. Thomas Chathamparampil CMI (Prior General)		
Congregation of Saint Thérèse of Lisieux (CST Fathers)	Religious Congregation	Fr. Jojo Varakukalayil CST (Superior General)		
Missionary Congregation for the Blessed Sacrament (MCBS)	Religious Congregation	Fr. Augustine Paikkattu MCBS (Prior General)		
Vincentian Congregation (VC)	Society of Common Life according to the Manner of Religious	Fr. Paul Puthuva VC (Superior General)		
=== Major-archiepiscopal Right ===
Congregation of Saint Thérèse of Lisieux (CST Brothers)	Religious Congregation	Bro. Varghese Manjaly CST (Superior General)		
Malabar Missionary Brothers (MMB)	Religious Congregation	Bro. Bastin Karuvelil MMB (Prior General)		
Missionary Society of St Thomas the Apostle (MST)	Society of Apostolic Life	Fr Vincent Kadalikattilputhenpura MST (Director General)		
=== Eparchial Right ===
Divya Karunya Matha Dayara (Benedictine) (DKMBM)	Monastery	Fr. Marianand Ethakkadu DKMBM (Abbot)		
Mar Thoma Sleeha Dayara (MTSD)	Monastery	Fr. Xavier Koodapuzha MTSD (Prior General)		
Preachers of Divine Mercy (PDM)	Monastery	Fr. Xavier Khan Vattayil PDM (Prior General)		
Missionary Society of St. Pius X (MSP)	Society of Apostolic Life	Fr. Mathew Manakkatt MSP (Prior General)		
Oblates of Sacred Heart (OSH)	Society of Common Life according to the Manner of Religious	Rev. Dr. Jose Kannuvettiel OSH (Superior General)		

=== Women ===
Name	Type	Head	Established (By/Year)	Remarks
=== Pontifical Right ===
Assisi Sisters of Mary Immaculate (ASMI)	Religious Congregation	Sr. Isbel Francis ASMI (Superior General)		
Congregation of Holy Family (CHF)	Religious Congregation	Sr. Annie Kuriakose CHF (Superior General)		
Congregation of the Mother of Carmel (CMC)	Religious Congregation	Sr. Grace Therese CMC (Superior General)		
Congregation of the Sisters of Charity (CSC)	Religious Congregation	Sr Rincy CSC (Superior General)		
Franciscan Clarist Congregation (FCC)	Religious Congregation	Sr Litty FCC (Superior General)		
Sisters of the Adoration of the Blessed Sacrament (SABS)	Religious Congregation	Sr. Rosily Jose Ozhukayil SABS (Superior General)		
Missionary Sisters of Mary Immaculate (MSMI)	Religious Congregation	Sr. Elsy Vadakkemury MSMI (Superior General)		
Medical Sisters of St. Joseph (MSJ)	Religious Congregation	Sr. Philomy MSJ (Superior General)		
Sisters of Charity of St. Vincent de Paul (SCV)	Religious Congregation	Sr. Philo Moolakkarayil SCV (Superior General)		
Sisters of the Destitute (SD)	Religious Congregation	Sr. Liss Grace Ayrookkaran SD (Superior General)		
Congregation of Sacred Heart (SH)	Religious Congregation	Sr. Alphonsa Thottumkal SH (Superior General)		
=== Major-archiepiscopal Right ===
Congregation of Preshitharam Sisters (CPS)	Religious Congregation	Sr. Dona CPS (Superior General)		
Congregation of the Sisters of St. Martha (CSM)	Religious Congregation	Sr. Rosin Jose CSM (Superior General)		
Congregation of the Sisters of Nazareth (CSN)	Religious Congregation	Sr Terecine CSN (Superior General)		
Congregation of Samaritan Sisters (CSS)	Religious Congregation	Sr. Alphonsa CSS (Superior General)		
Dominican Sisters of the Holy Trinity (DSHT-OP)	Religious Congregation	Sr.Tessy Kachappilly OP (Superior General)		
Daughters of St. Thomas (DST)	Religious Congregation	Sr. Salomy Mookenthottam DST (Superior General)		
Sisters of St. Martha’s Congregation (SMC)	Religious Congregation	Sr. Sneha Paul Vettickamattathil SMC (Superior General)		
Snehagiri Missionary Sisters (SMS)	Religious Congregation	Sr. Piusha SMS (Mother General)		
Society of Kristu Dasis (SKD)	Society of Common Life according to the Manner of Religious	Sr. Tina Kunnel SKD (Sister General)		
Society of Nirmala Dasi Sisters (SNDS)	Society of Common Life according to the Manner of Religious	Sr. Elsy Illickal SNDS (Superior General)		
=== Eparchial Right ===
Abhishekagni Sisters of Jesus and Mary (ASJM)	Monastery	Sr. Amy Emmanuel ASJM (Superior General)		
Dayara d’Emme d’Mshiha (DEM)	Monastery	Sr Anna Theresa DEM (Superior General)		
Mar Thoma Sahodarikal (MTS)	Monastery	Sr Roselin Aravackal Puthuparampil (Superior General)		
Order of Saint Benedict (Nava Jyothi Dayara) (OSB)	Monastery	Sr. Divya OSB (Prioress)		
Servants of the Handmaid of the Lord (Mangalavartha Dayara) (SHL)	Monastery	Sr. Kochuthresia SHL (Abess)		
Apostolic Sisters of Mary Immaculate (ASMI)	Religious Congregation	Sr. Mercy Maria ASMI (Superior General)		
Deen Bandhu Samaj (DBS)	Religious Congregation	Sr. Ann Mary Chembakasseril DBS (Superior General)		
Congregation of Devpriya Sisters (DP)	Religious Congregation	Sr. Daya Attupuram DP (Superior General)		
Little Servants of the Divine Providence (LSDP)	Religious Congregation	Sr. Mary Rosily LSDP (Superior General)		
Little Sisters of St. Therese of Lisieux (LST)	Religious Congregation	Sr. Cisily Ancheril LST (Superior General)		
Missionaries of Little Flower (MLF)	Religious Congregation	Sr. Merline Jacob MLF (Superior General)		
Congregation of Nazareth Sisters (NS)	Religious Congregation	Sr. Jaseentha Sebastian (Superior General)		
Sisters of Charity of St. John of God (SCJG)	Religious Congregation	Sr. Nirmala Kuriakose (Superior General)		
Sisters of St. Philip Neri (SFN)	Religious Congregation	Sr. Lisetta SFN (Superior General)		
Sisters of Jesus (SJ)	Religious Congregation	Sr. Kusumam Joseph SJ (Superior General)		
St. Joseph's Congregation (SJC)	Religious Congregation	Sr. Anitha SJC (Superior General)		
Sadhu Sevana Sabha (SSS)	Religious Congregation	Sr. Teena SSS (Superior General)		
Sisters of the Visitation of the Blessed Virgin Mary (SVM)	Religious Congregation	Sr. Immaculate SVM (Superior General)		
Society of Ladies of Mary Immaculate (SLMI)	Society of Common Life according to the Manner of Religious	Sr. Shaji Arangassery SLMI (Superior General)		
Caritas Secular Institute (CSI)	Secular Institute	Sr. Lisy Mudakkodil (Directress General)		
Mary Immaculate Secular Institute (MISI)	Secular Institute	Sr. Gracykutty Joseph (Directress General)		
Servants of Our Immaculate Lady (SOIL)	Secular Institute	Sr. Rosamma Mani SOIL (Superior General)		
Sisters of St. Alphonsa (SSA)	Secular Institute	Sr. Ancy Vattatharayil SSA (Superior General)		
Unitas Syro-Malabar Secular Institute (USMS)	Secular Institute	Sr. Deepa Thombil USMS (Superior General)		
Sisters of Win Society of Jesus (WIN SJ)	Secular Institute	Sr. Alice Lukose WIN SJ (Superior General)		
Deivadan Sisters (DDS)	Pious Union	Sr. Jiji DDS (Superior General)		
Fervent Daughters of the Sacred Heart of Jesus (FDSHJ)	Pious Union	Sr. Rose Chakkalakunnel FDSHJ (Superior General)		
Franciscan Sisters of Destitutes (FSD)	Pious Union	Sr. Kochuthresia FSD (Mother General)		
Josephine Sisters (JS)	Pious Union	Sr. Rosmin Chemmerappallil JS (Superior General)		
Little Sisters of Christ (LSC)	Pious Union	Sr. Navya Maria LSC (Superior General)		
Sisters of Mercy - Snehatheeram (SM)	Pious Union	Sr. Roselin SM (Superior General)		
Sisters of Mercy - Thrissur (SM)	Pious Union	Sr. Kochuthresia SM (Superior General)		
Sisters of St. Joseph the Worker (SSJW)	Pious Union	Sr. Ancy Mary SSJW (Superior General)		
Carmel Hermitage	Hermitage	Sr. Mary Josna (Hermitess)		
Snehadeepam Hermitage	Hermitage	Sadhvi Prasannadevi (Hermitess)		

== Syro-Malabar Province/Region/Delegation/Sector of Latin Institutes for the consecrated ==
Several Latin institutes have separate jurisdictions in the form of a province, region, delegation or sector specifically set up for the Syro-Malabar rite. These institutes have their origins in the Latin rite, but later set up separate jurisdictions. (Note: The Second Vatican Council's Decree on the Catholic Churches of the Eastern Rite (1964) said that "religious and associations of the Latin Rite working in Eastern countries or among Eastern faithful are earnestly counseled to found houses or even provinces of the Eastern rite, as far as this can be done", reflecting a practice developed from the time of Pope Pius XI.)

=== Men ===
Name	Type	Head	Province, region, delegation or sector	Remarks
=== Pontifical Right ===
Order of St. Benedict (OSB) - Congregation of the Annunciation of the Blessed Virgin Mary	Order	Fr. Clement Ettaniyil OSB (Abbot)	St. Thomas' Abbey	
Order of St. Benedict (OSB) - Missionary Benedictines of St. Ottilien	Order	Fr. John Kaippallimyalil OSB (Prior)	St. Michael's Priory	
Order of St. Benedict (OSB) - Vallombrosan Benedictine Congregation	Order	Fr. Bino Cheriyil OSB (Prior)	St. Mary's Priory of India	
Order of Canons Regular of Praemonstratensians (OPraem)	Order	Dr. Fr. Jose Murickan O.Praem (Superior General)	Canonry of Mananthavady - St. Norbert's Priory	
Order of the Brothers of the Most Blessed Virgin Mary of Mount Carmel (OCarm)	Order	Fr. Thankachan Sebastian Njaliath OCarm (Provincial Superior)	St. Thomas Province	
Order of the Discalced Carmelite (OCD)	Order	Fr Jacob Ettumanookaran OCD (Provincial)	Malabar Province	
Order of Friars Minor Capuchins (OFM Cap)	Order	Br Jaison Kalan OFM Cap (Provincial)	St. Thomas Province	
Order of Friars Minor Capuchins (OFM Cap)	Order	Br Thomas Karingadayil OFM Cap (Provincial)	Pavanatma Province	
Order of Friars Minor Capuchins (OFM Cap)	Order	Br. George Antony Assaricheril OFM Cap (Provincial)	St. Joseph Province	
Order of Friars Minor Conventuals (OFM Conv)	Order	Fr. Bonaventure Kalluvettukuzhiyil OFM Conv (Provincial)	St. Maximillian Kolbe Province	
Order of Clerics Regular Minor - Adorno Fathers (CRM)	Order	Fr Aneesh Koovalloor CRM (Delegation Superior)	Santhom Indo-German Delegation	
Congregation of the Most Holy Redeemer (CSsR)	Religious Congregation	Fr. Poly Kannnampuzha CSsR (Provincial Superior)	Liguori Province	
Congregation of the Missionary - Claretian (CMF)	Religious Congregation	Fr. Siby Njavallikunnel CMF (Provincial Superior)	St. Thomas Province	
Sacerdotal Secular Institute of Apostolic Sodales (SSIAS)	Secular Institute	Fr . Thomas Thekkemury SSIAS (National Major)	Syro-Malabar Sector	

=== Women ===
Name	Type	Head	Province, region, delegation or sector	Remarks
=== Pontifical Right ===
Order of Discalced Carmelite Nuns (OCD)	Monastery	Sr. Agnes of Jesus OCD (Mother Prioress)	Mount Carmel Cloistered Convent - Malabar Province	
Poor Clares of Perpetual Adoration (PCPA)	Monastery	Sr. Mary Josepha PCPA (Abbess)	Prem Jyothi Ashram, Mahua	
Poor Clares of Perpetual Adoration (PCPA)	Monastery	Sr. Mary Bernardine PCPA (Abbess)	Mar Sleeva Monastery, Vallichira	
Poor Clares of Perpetual Adoration (PCPA)	Monastery	Sr. Mary Tancy PCPA (Abbess)	Trinity Monastery, Chelacombu	
Daughters of Presentation of Mary in the Temple (DPMT)	Religious Congregation	Sr. Jees Joseph Vettukallamkuzhy DPMT (Provincial Superior)	Syro-Malabar Province	
Order of St. Francis - School Sisters (OSF)	Religious Congregation	Sr. Reena Kuriyan OSF (Provincial Superior)	Assisi Province	
Sisters of the Poor of St. Catherine of Siena (SdP)	Religious Congregation	Sr. Pauly Chakkiyath SdP (Provincial Superior)	Syro-Malabar Province	
Sisters of St. Joseph of St. Marc (SJSM)	Religious Congregation	Sr. Lilly Payyappilly SJSM (Provincial Superior)	Sanjo Province	
Daughters of the Charity of the Most Precious Blood (DCPB)	Religious Congregation	Sr. Rosily Palatty DCPB (Regional Superior)	Syro-Malabar Region	
Congregation of the Cellitines according to the Rule of St. Augustine (OSA)	Religious Congregation	Sr. Sobha OSA (Regional Superior)	Syro-Malabar Region	
Franciscan Handmaids of the Good Shepherd (FHGS)	Religious Congregation	Sr. Jessy Payyappilly FHGS (Provincial Superior)	Syro-Malabar Vice-Province	
Little Workers of the Sacred Hearts (LWSH)	Religious Congregation	Sr. Rose Antony Arackal LWSH (Delegate Superior)	Syro-Malabar Delegation	
Medical Mission Sisters (Society of Catholic Medical Missionaries) (MMS)	Secular Institute	Sr. Lilly Joseph Nellikunnel MMS (Provincial Superior)	South Indian Province	
Sisters of St. Ann (SAB)	Secular Institute	Sr. Lillies Varghese SAB (Provincial Superior)	St. Thomas Province	
Apostolic Oblates (AO)	Secular Institute	Sr. Leena George Arackal (National Major)	Syro-Malabar Sector	
=== Eparchial Right ===
Sisters of St. John the Baptist and Mary Queen (SJB)	Religious Congregation	Sr. Vidya Joseph SJB (Provincial Superior)	Syro-Malabar Province	

== Latin institutes for consecrated life having houses in Syro-Malabar eparchies ==
Several Latin institutions have their houses under Syro-Malabar eparchies, around 38 institutions for men, including the Camillians, Friars Minor, Rogationists, Salesians, Salvatorians, among others, and 132 different institutes for women, which include the Trinitarians, Missionaries of Charity, and Clarists, among others. They have members from all three rites (Latin, Malabar and Malankara), but are primarily under a Latin rite province, region, delegation or sector of their respective institutes, and serve the Syro-Malabar rite faithful.

== Syro Malankara institutes for consecrated life having houses in Syro-Malabar eparchies ==
The Congregation of the Daughters of Mary, a religious congregation for women, is the only Syro Malankara rite institute which has houses under Syro-Malabar eparchies.
