= Interior gateway protocol =

Class of routing protocols

An interior gateway protocol (IGP) or interior routing protocol is a type of routing protocol used for exchanging routing table information between gateways (commonly routers) within an autonomous system (for example, a system of corporate local area networks). This routing information can then be used to route network-layer protocols like IP.

Interior gateway protocols can be divided into two categories: distance-vector routing protocols and link-state routing protocols. Specific examples of IGPs include Open Shortest Path First (OSPF), Routing Information Protocol (RIP), Intermediate System to Intermediate System (IS-IS) and Enhanced Interior Gateway Routing Protocol (EIGRP).

By contrast, exterior gateway protocols are used to exchange routing information between autonomous systems and rely on IGPs to resolve routes within an autonomous system.

== Examples ==
Examples of distance-vector routing protocols:

- Routing Information Protocol (RIP)
- Routing Information Protocol Version 2 (RIPv2)
- Routing Information Protocol Next Generation (RIPng), an extension of RIP version 2 with support for IPv6
- Interior Gateway Routing Protocol (IGRP)
- Babel

Examples of link-state routing protocols:

- Open Shortest Path First (OSPF)
- Intermediate system to intermediate system (IS-IS)

Advanced distance vector routing protocols have both the features of distance vector routing protocols and link-state routing protocols. One example is Enhanced Interior Gateway Routing Protocol (EIGRP).

== See also ==
- Route analytics
