= Flood search routing =

In a telephone network, flood search routing is non-deterministic routing in which a dialed number received at a switch is transmitted to all switches, i.e., flooded, in the area code directly connected to that switch; if the dialed number is not an affiliated subscriber at that switch, the number is then retransmitted to all directly connected switches, and then routed through the switch that has the dialed number corresponding to the particular user end instrument affiliated with it. All digits of the numbering plan are used to identify a particular subscriber. Flood search routing allows subscribers to have telephone numbers independent of switch codes. Flood search routing provides the highest probability that a telephone call will go through even though a number of switches and links fail.

Flood search routing is used in military telecommunication systems, such as the mobile subscriber equipment (MSE) system.

== See also ==
- Flooding (computer networking)
