= Network analyzer =

Network analyzer may mean:

- Packet analyzer, used on a computer data network
- Network analyzer (AC power), an analog computer system used to study electrical power networks
- Network analyzer (electrical), a type of electronic test equipment

== See also ==
- Network management
