= Interior Gateway Routing Protocol =

Interior Gateway Routing Protocol (IGRP) is a distance vector interior gateway protocol (IGP) developed by Cisco. It is used by routers to exchange routing data within an autonomous system.

IGRP is a proprietary protocol. IGRP was created in part to overcome the limitations of RIP (maximum hop count of only 15, and a single routing metric) when used within large networks. IGRP supports multiple metrics for each route, including bandwidth, delay, load, and reliability; to compare two routes these metrics are combined into a single metric, using a formula which can be adjusted through the use of pre-set constants. By default, the IGRP composite metric is a sum of the segment delays and the lowest segment bandwidth. The maximum configurable hop count of IGRP-routed packets is 255 (default 100), and routing updates are broadcast every 90 seconds (by default). IGRP uses protocol number 9 for communication.

IGRP is considered a classful routing protocol. Because the protocol has no field for a subnet mask, the router assumes that all subnetwork addresses within the same Class A, Class B, or Class C network have the same subnet mask as the subnet mask configured for the interfaces in question. This contrasts with classless routing protocols that can use variable length subnet masks. Classful protocols have become less popular as they are wasteful of IP address space.

== Advancement ==
In order to address the issues of address space and other factors, Cisco created EIGRP (Enhanced Interior Gateway Routing Protocol). EIGRP adds support for VLSM (variable length subnet mask) and adds the Diffusing Update Algorithm (DUAL) in order to improve routing and provide a loopless environment. EIGRP has completely replaced IGRP, making IGRP an obsolete routing protocol. In Cisco IOS versions 12.3 and greater, IGRP is completely unsupported. In the new Cisco CCNA curriculum (version 4), IGRP is mentioned only briefly, as an "obsolete protocol".
