= Exterior Gateway Protocol =

Former Internet protocol

The Exterior Gateway Protocol (EGP) was a routing protocol used to connect different autonomous systems on the Internet from the mid-1980s until the mid-1990s, when it was replaced by Border Gateway Protocol (BGP).

== History ==
EGP was developed by Bolt, Beranek and Newman in the early 1980s. It was first described in RFC 827 and formally specified in RFC 904

RFC 1772 outlined a migration path from EGP to BGP.

== See also ==
- Interior gateway protocol
