= On Demand Routing =

Enhancement to Cisco Discovery Protocol

On-Demand Routing ("ODR") is an enhancement to Cisco Discovery Protocol (CDP), a protocol used to discover other Cisco devices on either broadcast or non-broadcast media.

With the help of CDP, it is possible to find the device type, the IP address, the Cisco IOS version running on the neighbor Cisco device, the capabilities of the neighbor device, and so on. In Cisco IOS software release 11.2, ODR was added to CDP to advertise the connected IP prefix of a stub router via CDP. This feature takes an extra five bytes for each network or subnet, four Bytes for the IP address, and one byte to advertise the subnet mask along with the IP. ODR is able to carry Variable Length Subnet Mask (VLSM) information.
