= Network administrator =

Person who maintains computer network infrastructure

A network administrator is a designated person in an organization whose responsibility includes maintaining computer infrastructures with emphasis on local area networks (LANs) up to wide area networks (WANs). Responsibilities may vary between organizations, but installing new hardware, on-site servers, enforcing licensing agreements, software-network interactions as well as network integrity and resilience are some of the key areas of focus.

== Duties ==
The role of the network administrator can vary significantly depending on an organization's size, location, and socioeconomic considerations. Some organizations work on a user-to-technical support ratio.

Network administrators are often involved in proactive work. This type of work will often include:

- Designing network infrastructure
- Implementing and configuring network hardware and software
- Network monitoring and maintaining the network
- Testing network for vulnerability & weakness
- Providing technical support
- Managing network resources
- Managing network documentation
- Managing vendor relationships
- Staying up to date with new technologies and best practices
- Providing training and guidance to other team members

Network administrators are responsible for making sure that computer hardware and network infrastructure related to an organization's data network are effectively maintained. In smaller organizations, they are typically involved in the procurement of new hardware, the rollout of new software, maintaining disk images for new computer installs, making sure that licenses are paid for and up to date for software that needs it, maintaining the standards for server installations and applications, monitoring the performance of the network, and checking for security breaches. A common question for the small to medium-sized business (SMB) network administrator is, how much bandwidth do I need to run my business? Typically, within a larger organization, these roles are split into multiple roles or functions across various divisions and are not actioned by the one individual. In other organizations, some of these roles mentioned are carried out by system administrators.

As with many technical roles, network administrator positions require a breadth of technical knowledge and the ability to learn the intricacies of new networking and server software packages quickly. Within smaller organizations, the more senior role of network engineer is sometimes attached to the responsibilities of the network administrator. It is common for smaller organizations to outsource this function.

== Occupational Outlook ==
The U.S. Bureau of Labor Statistics (BLS) Occupational Outlook predicts a decline for Network Administrators of -4 percent from 2024 to 2034

== See also ==
- Network analyzer (disambiguation)
- Network architecture
- Network management system
- System administrator
- Technical support
