= Metrics (networking) =

Field in a routing table used to make routing decisions

Routing metrics are configuration values used by a router to make routing decisions. A metric is typically one of many fields in a routing table. Router metrics help the router choose the best route among multiple feasible routes to a destination. The route will go in the direction of the gateway with the lowest metric.

A router metric is typically based on information such as path length, bandwidth, load, hop count, path cost, delay, maximum transmission unit (MTU), reliability and communications cost.

== Examples ==
A metric can include:

- measuring link utilization (using SNMP)
- number of hops (hop count)
- speed of the path
- packet loss (router congestion/conditions)
- network delay
- path reliability
- path bandwidth
- throughput [SNMP - query routers]
- load
- maximum transmission unit (MTU)
- administrator configured value

In EIGRP, metrics is represented by an integer from 0 to 4,294,967,295 (The size of a 32-bit integer). In Microsoft Windows XP routing it ranges from 1 to 9999.

A metric can be considered as:

- additive - the total cost of a path is the sum of the costs of individual links along the path,
- concave - the total cost of a path is the minimum of the costs of individual links along the path,
- multiplicative - the total cost of a path is the product of the costs of individual links along the path.

== Service level metrics ==
Router metrics are metrics used by a router to make routing decisions. It is typically one of many fields in a routing table.

Router metrics can contain any number of values that help the router determine the best route among multiple routes to a destination. A router metric is typically based on information like path length, bandwidth, load, hop count, path cost, delay, MTU, reliability and communications cost.

== See also ==
- Administrative distance, indicates the source of routing table entry and is used in preference to metrics for routing decisions
