= Tier 2 network =

Internet service provider leasing connectivity from one or more primary ("Tier 1") ISPs

Relationship between the various tiers of Internet providers

A Tier 2 network is an Internet service provider which engages in the practice of peering with other networks, but which also purchases IP transit to reach some portion of the Internet.

Tier 2 providers are the most common Internet service providers, as it is much easier to purchase transit from a Tier 1 network than to peer with them and attempt to become a Tier 1 carrier.

The term Tier 3 is sometimes also used to describe networks who solely purchase IP transit from other networks to reach the Internet.

== List of large or important Tier 2 networks ==
Name	AS Number	August 2021 degree	Reason
Hurricane Electric	6939	9243	IPv4: Purchases transit from Arelion/AS1299. IPv6: Does not provide IPv6 routing/connectivity to Cogent/AS174.
Cogent Communications	174	7041	IPv6: Does not provide IPv6 routing/connectivity to Hurricane Electric/AS6939.
Telkom Indonesia International	7713	551	Purchases transit from Lumen/AS3356, Cogent/AS174, Arelion/AS1299, NTT America/AS2914, Telecom Italia Sparkle/AS6762, Tata Communications/AS6453, Singtel/AS7473.
RETN	9002	1446	Purchases transit from Lumen/AS3356, Telecom Italia Sparkle/AS6762.
next layer	1764	987	Purchases transit from Lumen/AS3356, Cogent/AS174, Arelion/AS1299, NTT America/AS2914, GTT/AS3257, Inter.link/AS5405.
meerfarbig	34549	688	Purchases transit from Arelion/AS1299, GTT.
Korea Telecom	4766	578	Purchases transit from Lumen/AS3356, Arelion/AS1299, Cogent/AS174, Telecom Italia Sparkle/AS6762.
Fibrenoire	22652	127	Purchases transit from Arelion/AS1299, Cogent/AS174, Tata Communications/AS6453, GTT/AS3257.
SK broadband	9318	537	Purchases transit from Arelion/AS1299, Cogent/AS174, NTT America/AS2914, Tata Communications/AS6453, PCCW Global/AS3491, Verizon/AS701.
TDC	3292	191	Purchases transit from Lumen/AS3356, Arelion/AS1299.
Internet Initiative Japan	2497	329	Purchases transit from Lumen/AS3356, Cogent/AS174, Verizon/AS701, NTT America/AS2914.
Vodafone (formerly Cable and Wireless)	1273	303	Purchases transit from Arelion/AS1299.
KDDI	2516	308	Purchases transit from Lumen/AS3356, Arelion/AS1299, Verizon/AS701, GTT/AS3257.
PT Ekamas Mora Republik Tbk. (d/h PT Mora Telematika Indonesia Tbk.)	23947	243	Purchases transit from Cogent/AS174, GTT/AS3257, Hurricane Electric/AS6939.
China Telecom	4134/4809	318	Purchases transit from Cogent/AS174, Verizon/AS701, Lumen/AS3356.
China Unicom	4837	310	Purchases transit from Cogent/AS174, Verizon/AS701, Lumen/AS3356, Orange S.A./AS5511.
Chunghwa Telecom	3462	364	Purchases transit from Lumen/AS3356, Tata Communications/AS6453, NTT America/AS2914, Arelion/AS1299, Cogent/AS174.
British Telecom	5400	151	Purchases transit from Lumen/AS3356, Arelion/AS1299, NTT America/AS2914.
Comcast	7922	192	Purchases transit from Tata Communications/AS6453, NTT America/AS2914.
Tele2 (formerly SWIPNet)	1257	167	Purchases transit from Cogent/AS174.
KCOM Group	12390	69	Purchases transit from KPN/AS286, Lumen/AS3356, Cogent/AS174, NTT America/AS2914.
Spirit Communications	2711	82	Purchases transit from Lumen/AS3356, Cogent/AS174, Arelion/AS1299, NTT America/AS2914.
Stealth Communications	8002	47	Purchases transit from Cogent/AS174, NTT America/AS2914.
Internap	14744	33	Purchases transit from Cogent/AS174, NTT America/AS2914, Verizon/AS701.
FiberRing	38930	35	Purchases transit from NTT America/AS2914, Arelion/AS1299, Tata Communications/AS6453, Cogent/AS174.
Core-Backbone GmbH	33891	1311	Purchases transit from Lumen/AS3356, Arelion/AS1299.
Fiber Telecom	41327	2145	Purchases transit from Lumen/AS3356, GTT/AS3257, Telecom Italia Sparkle/AS6762, Arelion/AS1299.
Singtel	7473	359	Purchases transit from Arelion/AS1299, Zayo/AS6461, Tata Communications/AS6453, PCCW Global/AS3491.
SG.GS	24482	417	Purchases IP transit from NTT America/AS2914, Cogent/AS174, Tata Communications/AS6453.
Turk Telekom International (d/b/a Euroweb.ro)	9121/6663	250	Purchases IP transit from Lumen/AS3356, Arelion/AS1299, NTT America/AS2914, Deutsche Telekom Global Carrier/AS3320, China Telecom/AS4134&AS4809, Inter.link/AS5405.
EdgeUno	7195	758	Purchases transit from Lumen/AS3356, Cogent/AS174, Arelion/AS1299, NTT America/AS2914.
C Spire	11272	523	Purchases transit from Cogent/AS174, Zayo/AS6461, Lumen/AS3356, Arelion/AS1299.
FBW Networks	49434	1277	Purchases transit from Telecom Italia Sparkle/AS6762, Liberty Global/AS6830, Orange/AS5511.
Inter.link	5405	2331 (2026)	Purchases transit from Arelion/AS1299, NTT/AS2914, GTT/AS3257.

== See also ==
- Peering
- Network access point
