= Guifi.net =

Open, neutral, semi-wireless network

guifi.net

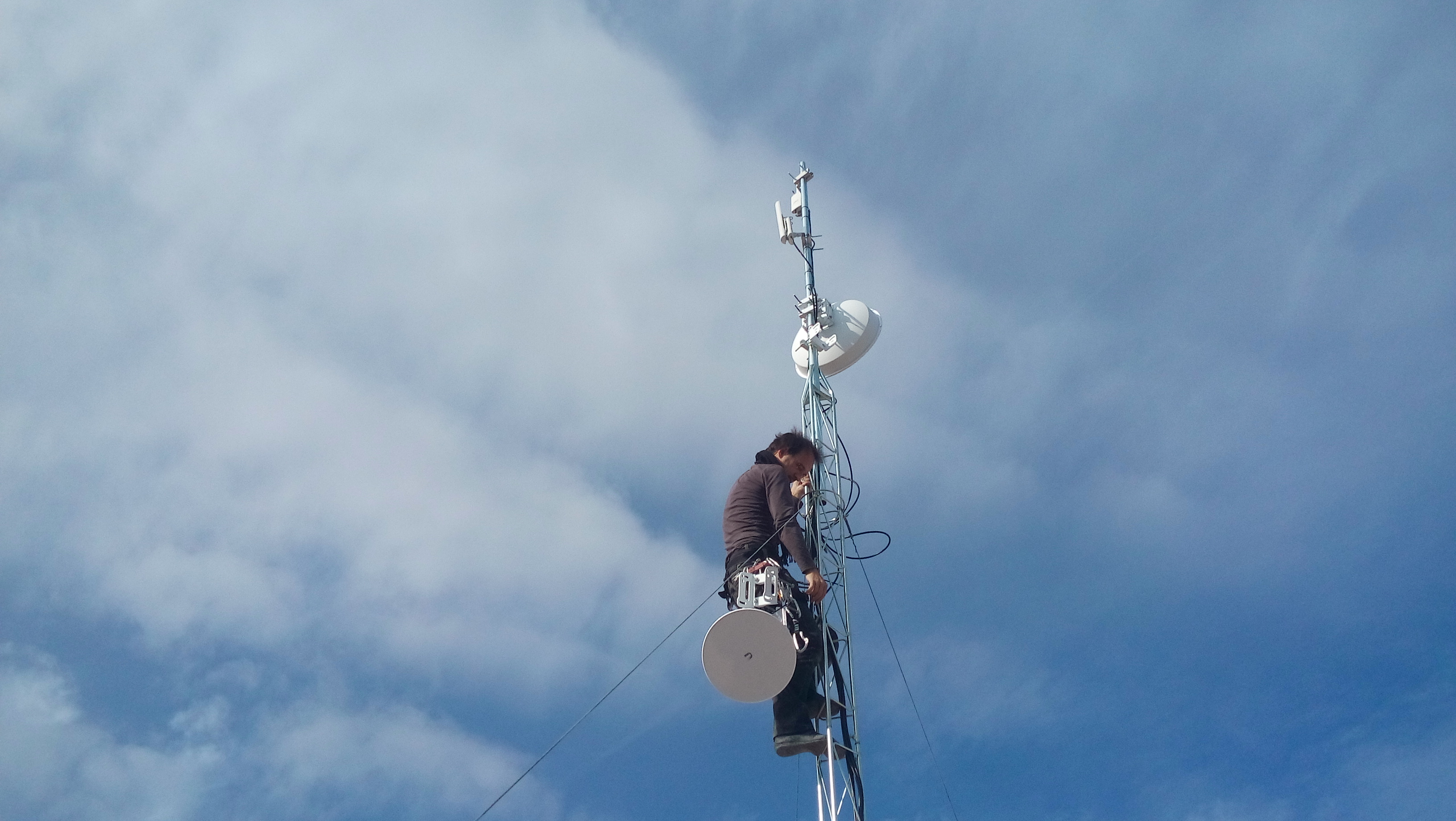
- Installation of a "supernode" of guifi.net's network in Tarragona
- Type: Data
- Location: Catalonia and Valencian Community, Spain
- Established: 2004; 21 years ago
- Current status: Active
- Commercial?: No
- Website: guifi.net/en
- ASN: 49835
- Peering policy: Open

Guifi.net is a free, open and neutral, mostly wireless community network, with over 37,000 active nodes and about 71,000 km of wireless links (as of December 2021). The majority of these nodes are located in Catalonia and the Valencian Community, in Spain, but the network is growing in other parts of the world. The network is self-organized and operated by the users using unlicensed wireless links and open optical fiber links.

The nodes of the network are contributed by individuals, companies and administrations that freely connect to an open telecommunications network and extend the network wherever the infrastructure and content might not otherwise be accessible. Nodes join the network following the self-provision model since the whole structure is explicitly open to facilitate understanding how it is structured, so that everyone can create new sections as required. That results in a network infrastructure commons that provides abundant connectivity.

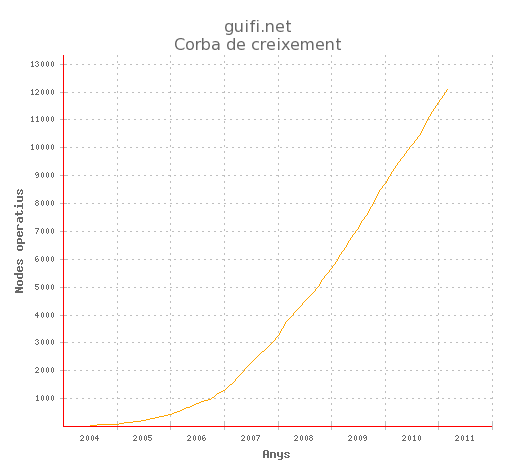
Growth curve of nodes in the guifi.net network by year. March 15th, 2011

Guifi.net is supported by the Guifi.net Foundation, which has been registered as an operator with the Spanish Telecommunications Market Commission (CMT) since April 2009. In August 2009, the first deployment of optical fiber was started, known as the Fiber From The Farms (FFTF) Broadband Initiative, covering about 2 km and linking dozens of farms and farmhouses in the town of Gurb.

Since early 2011, guifi.net has been connected to the Catalonia Neutral Internet Exchange Point (CATNIX), which exchanges data with other international telecommunications operators such as Cogent Communications and Hurricane Electric. This Internet connection is used by several associations that offer their members high-speed Internet access at low cost, which other Internet service providers currently do not offer. The model is oriented to cost sharing, the compensation mechanism.

The basic principle of operation is based on the Wireless Commons License.

== See also ==
- Mesh networking
- Freifunk
- NYC Mesh
- internet (lowercase "i"), a collection of interconnected computers and/or networks (companies, neighborhoods, villages, communities) that are set up to communicate with each other
