= Eyeball network =

Computer networking slang term

Eyeball network is a slang term used by network engineers and architects that refers to an access network whose primary users use the network to “look at things” (browse the Internet, read email, etc.) and consume content, as opposed to a network that may be used primarily to generate its own data, or “content networks/providers”.

The term “eyeball network” is often overheard in conversations and seen in articles that discuss peering relationships between other networks, as well as net neutrality issues.

An example of an eyeball network would be any given ISP that provides internet connectivity to end-users – The ISP may peer with Google (which is a content provider) where the end users consume content serviced/provided by Google, in this case the ISP is just an “eyeball network” providing a means for the end user to reach Google provided actual content.

Not all ISPs are eyeball networks, they can be pure transit providers. With Tier 2 networks and lower, they can serve as both an eyeball network and a transit provider, depending on their business model. In the modern day ecosystem where peering is given priority, the lines are blurred between the different types of networks as ultimately any given network must be able to reach every other given network on the internet at large.
