= Šventoji =

Šventoji (literally: feminine gender of the holy) can refer to these objects in Lithuania:

- Šventoji River, 246-kilometer long tributary of Neris
- Šventoji River (Baltic), 73-kilometer long tributary of the Baltic Sea
- Šventoji, Lithuania, resort town on the coast of the Baltic Sea
