= Hurricane Electric =

American telecommunications provider

- Type: Private
- Industry: Internet service provider
- Founded: 1994; 32 years ago
- Headquarters: Fremont, California, United States
- Key people: Mike Leber, founder; Reid Fishler, Senior Director; Walt Wollny, Sr. peering manager; Mike Tindle, Sr. network admin; Jason Meyer, Sr. network admin
- Services: IP transit, colocation, dedicated servers
- ASN: 6939
- Peering policy: Open and Free (No Contract Required)
- Website: www.he.net

Hurricane Electric is an American Internet service provider offering Internet transit, tools, and network applications, as well as data center colocation and hosting services at one location in San Jose, California and two locations in Fremont, California, where the company is based.

As of June 2024, according to its own data, Hurricane Electric is the largest global IP network as measured by network adjacencies in both IPv4 and IPv6. It is also the largest global IPv6 network as measured by IPv6 prefixes announced, and the fifth-largest global IP network as measured by IPv4 prefixes announced, according to its own data.

== IPv6 ==
Hurricane Electric operates the largest Internet Protocol version 4 (IPv4) and Internet Protocol version 6 (IPv6) transit networks globally, as measured by the count of peering interconnections to other networks. The majority of these adjacencies are native IPv6 BGP sessions.

Hurricane Electric offers an IPv6 tunnel broker service, providing free connectivity to the IPv6 Internet via 6in4 IPv6 transition mechanisms. Prior to 2020, the service allowed users to peer with Hurricane Electric over the tunnel using Border Gateway Protocol (BGP) to announce their routes. Users attempting to sign up to use BGP over a tunnel received a message that they were no longer available for free due to abuse. Regular tunnels remain available. The company provides an online IPv6 certification program to further education and compliance in IPv6 technology. As of June 18, 2024, the company reports 52,760 provisioned tunnels spanning 174 countries via the IPv6 tunnel broker. 21,512 individuals in 164 countries have reached the highest level of the IPv6 certification.

== Peering ==
Within its global network, Hurricane Electric is connected to more than 338 major exchange points and exchanges IP traffic directly with more than 11,990 different networks. Hurricane Electric currently has 55+ Terabits per second active public peering capacity and 900+ Terabits per second active private peering capacity.

The European Internet Exchange Association (Euro-IX) ranks Hurricane Electric first in the world for the number of connections to Internet exchange points, with presence at more than 170 of Euro-IX member IXPs.

=== Cogent dispute ===
There is a long-running dispute between the provider Cogent Communications and Hurricane Electric. Cogent has been refusing to peer settlement-free with Hurricane Electric since 2009. Due to this, IPv6 traffic cannot be interchanged between both networks. IPv4 traffic can still be interchanged since Hurricane Electric is only a Tier 1 operator for IPv6 but not for IPv4. IPv4 traffic between both networks is routed via Arelion.

=== IncogNET dispute ===
In July 2023, Hurricane Electric added a BGP filtering rule to deny traffic to and from the controversial discussion forum Kiwi Farms. The ISP company IncogNET filed a complaint to the Washington State Attorney General's Office in response to this. As of 2025, there is no publicly available record indicating that the Washington Attorney General pursued enforcement action or issued a formal ruling related to the complaint.
