= Tier 1 network =

Top level network on the internet

A Tier 1 network is an Internet Protocol (IP) network that can reach every other network on the Internet solely via settlement-free interconnection (also known as settlement-free peering). In other words, tier 1 networks can exchange traffic with other Tier 1 networks without paying any fees for the exchange of traffic in either direction. In contrast, Tier 2 and Tier 3 networks must pay to transmit traffic on some or all other networks.

Classic (hierarchical) relationship between the various tiers of Internet providers before the advent of large content providers and CDNs

There is no authority that defines tiers of networks participating in the Internet. The most common and well-accepted definition of a Tier 1 network is a network that can reach every other network on the Internet without purchasing IP transit or paying for peering. By this definition, a Tier 1 network must be a transit-free network (purchases no transit) that peers for no charge with every other Tier 1 network and can reach all major networks on the Internet. Not all transit-free networks are Tier 1 networks, as it is possible to become transit-free by paying for peering, and it is also possible to be transit-free without being able to reach all major networks on the Internet.

The most widely quoted source for identifying Tier 1 networks is published by Renesys Corporation, but the base information to prove the claim is publicly accessible from many locations, such as the RIPE RIS database, the Oregon Route Views servers, Packet Clearing House, and others.

It can be difficult to determine whether a network is paying for peering or transit, as these business agreements are rarely public information, or are covered under a non-disclosure agreement. The Internet peering community is roughly the set of peering coordinators present at the Internet exchange points on more than one continent. The subset representing Tier 1 networks is collectively understood in a loose sense, but not published as such.

Common definitions of Tier 2 and Tier 3 networks:

- Tier 2 network: A network that peers for no charge with some networks, but still purchases IP transit or pays for peering to reach at least some portion of the Internet.
- Tier 3 network: A network that solely purchases transit/peering from other networks to participate in the Internet.

Since approximately 2010, this hierarchical organization of Internet relationships has evolved. Large content providers with private networks and CDNs, like Google, Netflix, and Meta, have greatly reduced the role of Tier 1 ISPs and flattened the internet topology since the content providers interconnect directly with most other ISPs, bypassing Tier 1 transit providers.

== History ==
The original Internet backbone was the ARPANET, which provided the routing between most participating networks. The development of the British JANET (1984) and U.S. NSFNET (1985) infrastructure programs to serve their nations' higher education communities, regardless of discipline, resulted in the NSFNet backbone by 1989. The Internet could be defined as the collection of all networks connected and able to interchange Internet Protocol datagrams with this backbone. Such was the weight of the NSFNET program and its funding ($200 million from 1986 to 1995)—and the quality of the protocols themselves—that by 1990, when the ARPANET itself was finally decommissioned, TCP/IP had supplanted or marginalized most other wide-area computer network protocols worldwide.

When the Internet was opened to the commercial markets, multiple for-profit Internet backbone and access providers emerged. The network routing architecture then became decentralized and this meant a need for exterior routing protocols: in particular, the Border Gateway Protocol emerged. New Tier 1 ISPs and their peering agreements supplanted the government-sponsored NSFNet, that program being officially terminated on April 30, 1995. The NSFnet-supplied regional networks then sought to buy national-scale Internet connectivity from these now-numerous private long-haul networks.

== Routing through peering ==
A bilateral private peering agreement typically involves a direct physical link between two partners. Traffic from one network to the other is then primarily routed through that direct link.

A Tier 1 network may have various such links to other Tier 1 networks. Peering is founded on the principle of equality of traffic between the partners and as such disagreements may arise between partners in which usually one of the partners unilaterally disconnects the link in order to force the other into a payment scheme. Such disruptive de-peering has happened several times during the first decade of the 21st century. When this involves large-scale networks involving many millions of customers this may effectively partition a part of the Internet involving those carriers, especially if they decide to disallow routing through alternate routes. This is not largely a technical issue but a commercial matter in which a financial dispute is fought out using the other party's customers as hostages to obtain a better negotiating position. In the worst case, single-homed customers of each network will not be able to reach the other network at all. The de-peering party then hopes that the other network's customers will be hurt more by the decision than its own customers which may eventually conclude the negotiations in its favor. Lower tier ISPs and other parties not involved in the dispute may be unaffected by such a partition as there exist typically multiple routes onto the same network. The disputes referenced have also typically involved transit-free peering in which one player only exchanged data with the other that involved each other's networks—there was no data transiting through the other's network destined for other parts of the Internet. By the strict definition of peering and the strict definition of a Tier 1 network, a Tier 1 network only peers with other Tier 1 networks and has no transit routes going anywhere. More practically speaking, Tier 1 networks serve as transit networks for lower tier networks and only peer with other Tier 1 networks that offer the same services on an adequate scale—effectively being "peers" in the truest sense of the word.

More appropriately then, peering means the exchange of an equitable and fair amount of data-miles between two networks, agreements of which do not preclude any pay-for-transit contracts to exist between the very same parties. On the subject of routing, settlement-free peering involves conditions disallowing the abuse of the other's network by sending it traffic not destined for that network (i.e. intended for transit). Transit agreements however would typically cater for just such outbound packets. Tier 1 providers are more central to the Internet backbone and would only purchase transit from other Tier 1 providers, while selling transit to providers of all tiers. Given their huge networks, Tier 1 providers often do not participate in public Internet Exchanges but rather sell transit services to such participants and engage in private peering. Colocation centers often host private peering connections between their customers, internet transit (tier 1) providers and cloud providers.

In the most logical definition, a Tier 1 provider will never pay for transit because the set of all Tier 1 providers sells transit to all of the lower tier providers everywhere, and because

1. all Tier 1 providers peer with every other Tier 1 provider globally and,
2. the peering agreement allows access to all of the transit customers, this means that
3. the Tier 1 network contains all hosts everywhere that are connected to the global Internet.

As such, by the peering agreement, all the customers of any Tier 1 provider already have access to all the customers of all the other Tier 1 providers without the Tier 1 provider itself having to pay transit costs to the other networks. Effectively, the actual transit costs incurred by provider A on behalf of provider B are logically identical to the transit costs incurred by provider B on behalf of provider A—hence there not being any payment required.

== List of Tier 1 networks ==
These networks are universally recognized as Tier 1 networks, because they can reach the entire internet (IPv4 and IPv6) via settlement-free peering. The CAIDA AS rank is a rank of importance on the internet.

Name	Headquarters	AS number	CAIDA AS rank	Fiber route (km)	Peering policy
AT&T	United States	7018	31	660,000	AT&T Peering policy
Deutsche Telekom Global Carrier	Germany	3320	17	250,000	DTAG Peering Details
GTT Communications	United States	3257	3	232,934	GTT Peering Policy
Liberty Global	United States; United Kingdom; Netherlands	6830	36	800,000	Peering Principles
Lumen Technologies (formerly CenturyLink, formerly Level 3)	United States	3356	1	885,139	Lumen Peering Policy
NTT Communications (formerly Verio)	Japan	2914	5	?	Global Peering Policy
Orange	France	5511	12	495,000	OTI peering policy
PCCW Global	Hong Kong	3491	10	?	Peering policy
Tata Communications (prev. VSNL prev. Teleglobe)	India	6453	7	700,000	Peering Policy
Telecom Italia Sparkle (Seabone)	Italy	6762	9	560,000	Peering Policy
Arelion (formerly Telia Carrier)	Sweden	1299	2	70,000	Arelion's IP Network Peering Policy
Telxius (Subsidiary of Telefónica)	Spain	12956	15	65,000	Peering Policy
Verizon Enterprise Solutions (formerly UUNET)	United States	701	37	805,000	Verizon UUNET Peering policy 701, 702, 703
Zayo Group (formerly AboveNet)	United States	6461	8	196,339	Zayo Peering Policy

While most of these Tier 1 providers offer global coverage (based on the published network map on their respective public websites), there are some which are restricted geographically. However these do offer global coverage for mobiles and IP-VPN type services which are unrelated to being a Tier 1 provider.

A 2008 report shows Internet traffic relying less on U.S. networks than previously.

== Regional Tier 1 networks ==
A common point of contention regarding Tier 1 networks is the concept of a regional Tier 1 network. A regional Tier 1 network is a network which is not transit-free globally, but which maintains many of the classic behaviors and motivations of a Tier 1 network within a specific region.

A typical scenario for this characteristic involves a network that was the incumbent telecommunications company in a specific country or region, usually tied to some level of government-supported monopoly. Within their specific countries or regions of origin, these networks maintain peering policies which mimic those of Tier 1 networks (such as lack of openness to new peering relationships and having existing peering with every other major network in that region). However, this network may then extend to another country, region, or continent outside of its core region of operations, where it may purchase transit or peer openly like a Tier 2 network.

A commonly cited example of these behaviors involves the incumbent carriers within Australia, who will not peer with new networks in Australia under any circumstances, but who will extend their networks to the United States and peer openly with many networks. Less extreme examples of much less restrictive peering requirements being set for regions in which a network peers, but does not sell services or have a significant market share, are relatively common among many networks, not just regional Tier 1 networks.

While the classification regional Tier 1 holds some merit for understanding the peering motivations of such a network within different regions, these networks do not meet the requirements of a true global Tier 1 because they are not transit-free globally.

== Other major networks ==
This is a list of networks that are often considered and close to the status of Tier 1, because they can reach the majority (50+%) of the internet via settlement-free peering with their global rings. However, routes to one or more Tier 1 are missing or paid. Therefore, they are technically Tier 2, though practically something in between.

Name	Headquarters	AS Number	CAIDA AS Rank	Reason
China Telecom	China	23764/4134	32/118	Purchases transit from Lumen/AS3356, Cogent/AS174, Verizon/AS701.
China Unicom	China	4837	215	Purchases transit from Cogent/AS174, Verizon/AS701, Lumen/AS3356, Orange/AS5511.
Singtel	Singapore	7473	25	Purchases transit from Arelion/AS1299, Zayo/AS6461, Tata Communications/AS6453.
Cogent Communications (formerly PSINet)	United States	174	4	No IPv6 routes to Hurricane Electric/AS6939.
Hurricane Electric	United States	6939	6	IPv4: Purchases transit from Arelion/AS1299 to reach GTT/AS3257, NTT/AS2914 and Cogent/AS174. IPv6: Lack of peering with Cogent/AS174.
RETN	United Kingdom	9002	11	Purchases transit from Lumen/AS3356 to reach Cogent/AS174.
Vodafone Carrier Services (formerly Cable & Wireless)	United Kingdom	1273	14	Purchases transit from Arelion/AS1299 to reach AT&T/AS7018 and part of NTT/AS2914.
Telstra	Australia	4637	13	Purchases transit from Lumen/AS3356, Arelion/AS1299, Zayo/AS6461.
Comcast	United States	7922	38	Purchases transit from Tata/AS6453

== See also ==
- Optical Carrier transmission rates
- Interconnect agreement
- Internet exchange point
- List of Internet exchange points
