= Port of Šventoji =

Port in Šventoji, Lithuania

Coordinates: 56°1′39″N 21°4′34″E

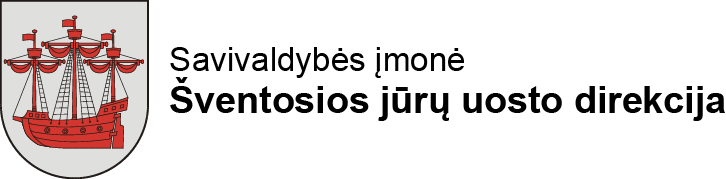
Logo of Šventoji Seaport Authority

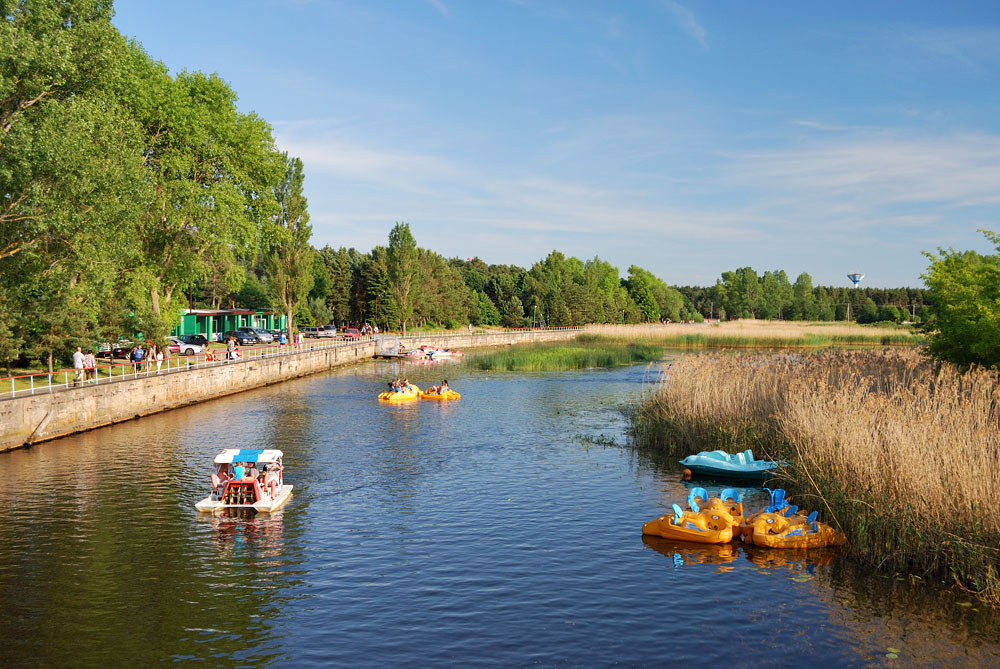
Incomplete port

The Port of Šventoji (Lithuanian: Šventosios valstybinis jūrų uostas) is a port in the city of Šventoji, Lithuania. It is located at the mouth of Šventoji River and Baltic Sea. The new port of Šventoji is currently under construction.
