= BCS East-West Interlink =

Lithuania–Sweden submarine communication cable

- Owners: Arelion
- Landing points: 1. Šventoji, Lithuania; 2. Katthammarsvik, Gotland, Sweden
- Total length: 218 km
- Date of first use: November 1997

The BCS East-West Interlink is a submarine data communication cable that runs through the Baltic Sea, owned by Arelion. It connects Šventoji in Lithuania to Katthammarsvik on the east coast of the Swedish island of Gotland. The 218-kilometre (135 mi) long cable was in operation from November 1997 to November 18, 2024.

== History ==
The submarine cable was built in 1997 by Alcatel. The telecommunications company Telia Lithuania announced on 18 November 2024 that the submarine cable between Lithuania and Sweden had been "cut" on Sunday morning at around 10 a.m. local time. At around the same time, the submarine cable C-Lion1 for data communication between Finland and Germany was cut in the same region of the Baltic Sea.
