= Telecom Italia Sparkle =

Italian telecommunications company

Telecom Italia Sparkle S.p.A.
- Formerly: Telemedia International Italia S.p.A. (1987-2003)
- Company type: Subsidiary
- Industry: Telecommunications
- Founded: 1987; 39 years ago in Rome, Italy
- Founder: Italcable
- Headquarters: Rome, Italy
- Area served: Worldwide
- Key people: Alessandro Pansa (chairman); Enrico Maria Bagnasco (Chief executive officer)
- Products: Tier 1 network
- Owner: Telecom Italia (100%)
- Parent: Telecom Italia
- ASN: 6762
- Website: www.tisparkle.com

Telecom Italia Sparkle S.p.A. (formerly Telemedia International Italia S.p.A.) is an Italian telecommunications company owned by Telecom Italia S.p.A. of which it manages the Tier 1 network.

Through Seabone (South East Access backBONE), the fiber-optic backbone based on DWDM technology, present in Europe, America, Asia and the rest of the world, Telecom Italia Sparkle provides international routing for most of the telephone traffic and data generated by Telecom Italia users, as well as reselling services to third parties.

As of 2017 it was the seventh worldwide operator in the sector and second in Europe, behind Telia Carrier.

== History ==
The company was founded in 1987 under the name of Telemedia International Italia, founded by Italcable (STET group) to operate in the deregulated telecommunications services market.

In 1993 it became a supplier of Martín Varsavsky's Viatel.

Active in 41 countries with 100 offices, it provides advanced global telecommunications services including data transmission, voice, images, messaging, video communication and outsourcing to Internet service providers (ISPs), companies and organizations, with a market entirely outside Italy.

In 1994 the shareholder Italcable (and its network) merged with Telecom Italia.

In 1997 it entered into an agreement with IBM, whereby both companies committed to marketing each other's products.

From 1 January 2003 it took the name Telecom Italia Sparkle, receiving from the holding company Telecom Italia the task of developing the market of international services for fixed and mobile operators, ISPs and multinationals.

Since 2017 the company, together with Telsy, has been subject to the Golden Power regulation, as a company holding activities of strategic importance for defense and national security.

On October 2, 2024, the MEF and Retelit submit an offer to purchase the company to Telecom Italia for 700 million euros.

On 13 January 2025, the Milan court rejected the appeal presented by Vivendi against the board of directors for the sale of TIM (formerly Telecom Italia)'s network. On 15 January 2025, TIM's board of directors discussed the offer presented by the Ministry of Economy and Finance and Retelit for the sale of Sparkle. The proposed offer is approximately 700 million euros for full control of Sparkle. Furthermore, 20 January 2025 is also the deadline for TIM to negotiate with the Italian Government an agreement on the refund of the 1998 license fee, an agreement worth hundreds of millions of euros. If both deals go through, there could be a further €1.8 billion cut in TIM's already reduced debt. On 15 January 2025, the stock closed the trading day with a +0.47% at a price of €0.258, confirming a bullish trend that takes it away from the minimum values reached last year.

== Network ==
The network spans 600,000 kilometers of optical fiber with a transmission capacity of 24 terabits (2 million times greater than urban fibers), extending from the Mediterranean Sea to the Atlantic Ocean and the Indian Ocean, and has been leased to 500 clients including Google and Facebook. For example, 80% of Israel's Internet traffic passes through Sparkle’s cables.

It is the only Western company to have established a point of presence in Iran.

== See also ==
- Telecom Italia
