= Metamor Worldwide =

IT services and consulting company

Metamor Worldwide was an IT services and consulting company based in Houston, Texas, which grew rapidly in the late 1990s before it was acquired by internet service provider PSINet in 2000, and ultimately split up in the wake of the latter company's bankruptcy.

The company began life as CoreStaff Services, and grew by acquisition. Major acquisitions included Metamor Technologies and Dynamic Data Solutions in 1997, The Windward Group and VSI Communications Group in 1998, and Decan Groupe and GE Capital Consulting in 1999.

Corestaff changed its name to Metamor Worldwide in 1998, following its acquisition of Metamor Technologies. Corestaff CEO Michael Willis told shareholders the new branding was intended to highlight the company's transition from a staffing shop to a full-service information technology provider. Continuing the transition, Metamor sold Corestaff Services, its original business unit, to The Corporate Services Group in July 1998.

Chicago-based Metamor Technologies, a branch of Houston-based Metamor Worldwide, was spun off as Xpedior Inc. in 1999.

Metamor Worldwide was acquired by PSINet in early 2000 for $1.9 billion in stock. Some analysts point to the Metamor acquisition as a contributing factor in the decline of PSINet, which went bankrupt in 2001. Following the PSINet bankruptcy, some of the individual companies that had been merged to create Metamor Worldwide were spun out, while others were liquidated.
