= Susan Estrada =

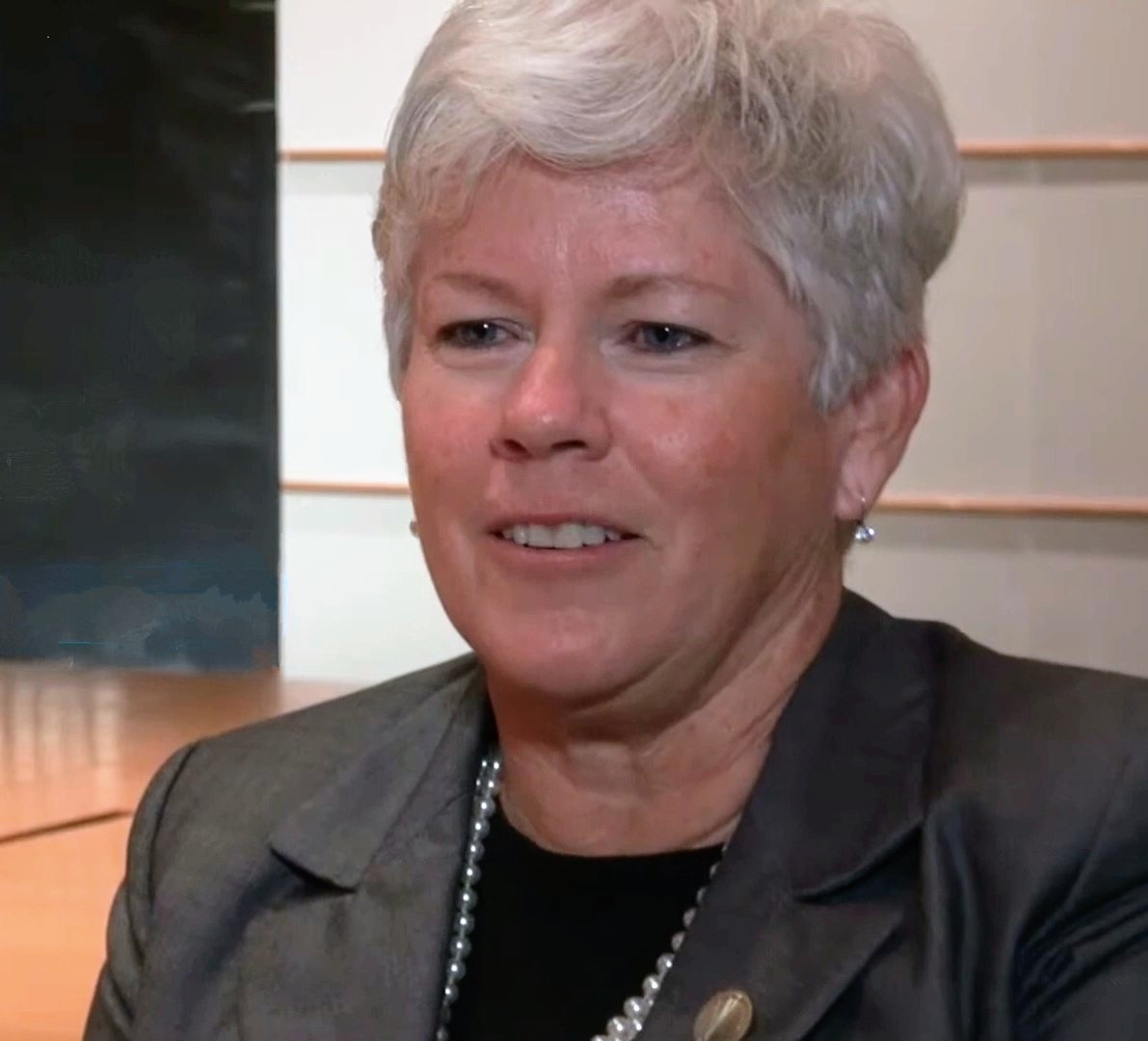
- Citizenship: American
- Board member of: Internet Society

Susan Estrada is in the Internet Hall of Fame for founding CERFnet, one of the original regional IP networks, in 1988. Through her leadership and collaboration with PSINet and UUnet, Estrada helped form the interconnection enabling the first commercial Internet traffic via the Commercial Internet Exchange.

She founded Aldea Communications, Inc. and wrote Connecting to the Internet in 1993. Estrada was inducted to the Internet Hall of Fame in 2014.

Formerly on the board of trustees of the Internet Society.
