= Infestus =

German Metal band founded in 2003

- Origin: Garmisch-Partenkirchen
- Genres: Black Metal, Progressive Metal, Doom Metal, Heavy Metal
- Years active: 2003-
- Labels: Debemur Morti Productions
- Members: Andras - drums, guitars, bass, vocals, lyrics
- Past members: Dagon (2003-2009) Harbarth (2003-2005)
- Website: www.infestus.com www.facebook.com/infestus.official

Infestus is a German Metal band founded in 2003. Since 2010 Infestus is continued as a solo-project by founding member Andras. The musical style is based on Black Metal influenced by Progressive Metal, Doom Metal and Thrash-/Heavy Metal.

== History ==
The band was founded in the year 2003 in Garmisch-Partenkirchen, Bavaria. Founding members are Andras (a.k.a. Moloc), Dagon and Harbarth. In the founding year the first demo "Of Ancient Splendour" was released. In 2004 they published their first album "Worshiping Times of Old". On these two releases Dagon was responsible for vocals, Harbarth played guitar and Andras drums and bass. Andras additionally took over the main part of composing on the split-album with Lost Life published via Fullmoon Funeral Productions. Harbarth left the band in 2005 due to personal circumstances and lack of motivation.

Developments at that time in the Black Metal scene (brotherhoods, federations) caused Andras and Dagon to withdraw from the scene and stage since they shared the opinion that the true evolvement of this genre can solely be found in loneliness of the individual. For the album "Chroniken des Ablebens" (29.8.2008, Debemur Morti Productions) Andras completely took over composing, the whole instrumentation (drums, guitars, bass) and a part of the lyrics. Dagon concentrated on vocals and lyrics. Being a concept album, "Chroniken des Ablebens" was supposed to extend the moment of dying with all its emotional distress to the length of a CD.

In addition to composition and complete instrumentation, Andras gives his debut as a vocalist on the concept album "Ex|Ist" (2011, Debemur Morti Productions) since Dagon had left the formation in 2010. Andras' very personal album concept and the missing opportunity for rehearsals are said to be the main reasons. The album's concept of psychotic dissociative conditions is reflected in the album's title "Ex|Ist", "Ex" representing the past and "Ist" synonymous for the present; both syllables are separated by a line (presumably a personal point of time). In a bilingual approach it is also supposed to be interpreted as the verb "to exist" in contrast to "to live" in order to define a condition far away from emotion or personality in consequence of a chronic psychiatric disease.

In 2012 Andras tried to recruit session members for live purposes in order to bring Infestus back on stage after 7 years of avoidance. This undertaking failed at the first attempt and resulted in dissolution of the first live line-up. The first concert with new live-members and Andras appearing as vocalist on stage took place in 2013. Since then many line-up changes took place.

On April 25, 2014 the second concept album "The Reflecting Void" was released, again by Debemur Morti Productions. The concept interprets the sensation of inner emptiness as a deceiving reflexion which hides the true reason and is broken open by Andras in order to dare a glimpse on repressed truths. The synthesis of this concept concludes that catharsis is an illusion.

Then as now, Andras describes the deep emotional connection with his work which he defines as his inner demons that gain access to our reality through his hands.

With "The Reflecting Void" Andras moves away from Black Metal a little more and leaves room for other influences in order to create a more complete picture of his personality.

Peering into the reflective depths of his inner void, Andras discovered what he termed as "thryptic" occurrences—events of profound significance. These revelations fueled the creation of his third solo concept album, "Thrypsis," released in October 2018. The album's theme draws inspiration from the biological phenomenon known as chromothripsis, wherein living cells experience a catastrophic chain reaction resulting in extensive genetic damage, potentially leading to cell death or cancer. Andras posits a parallel between this biological mechanism and a metaphorical counterpart on the psychological plane of human consciousness. According to him, just as chromothripsis wreaks havoc on cellular genetics, so do "thryptic events" inflict profound psychic wounds that reverberate throughout one's being, leaving an indelible mark on life.

== Style ==
Initially rooted in Black Metal, the musical expression evolves with Andras continuing Infestus as a solo-project to an inventive composition of different styles using Black Metal as foundation. Melancholic melodies are being paired with raw aggression, introspective acoustic moments and bluesy guitars. Within the complex partly progressive compositions which from time to time appear "almost jazzy", "old boundaries of Black Metal have no access here"

== Discography ==
- 2004: "Worshiping Times of Old" CD (self released)
- 2008: "Chroniken des Ablebens" CD/LP (Debemur Morti Productions)
- 2011: "Ex|Ist" CD (Debemur Morti Productions)
- 2014: "The Reflecting Void" CD/LP (Debemur Morti Productions)
- 2018: "Thrypsis" CD/LP/limited LP (Debemur Morti Productions)
- 2024: "Entzweiung" 6-panel digipack (Talheim Records)

== Splits and compilations ==
- 2005: Split Album mit Lost Life CD
- 2012: Debemur Morti Productions compilation CD
