= Šventoji, Lithuania =

Šventoji
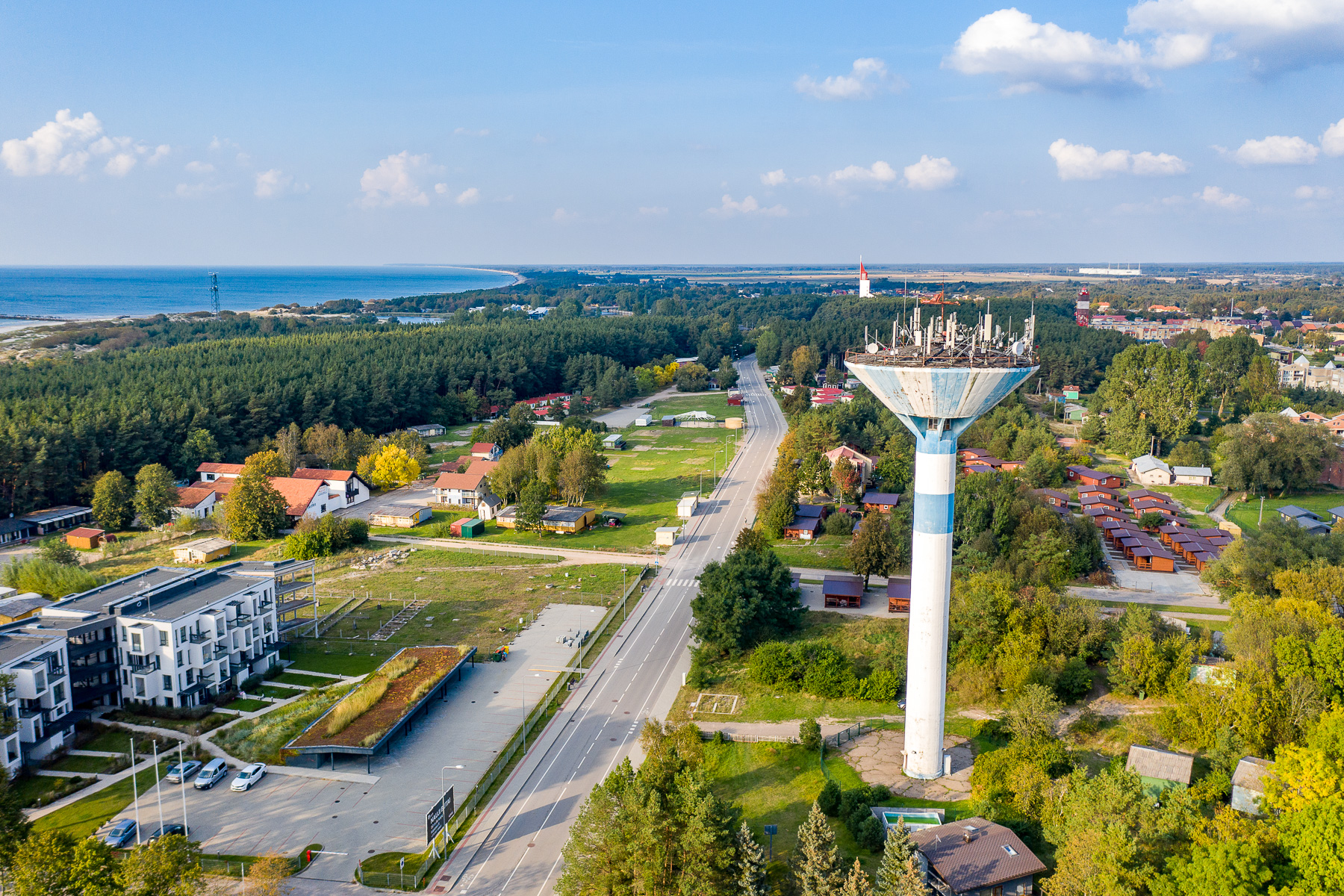
- Aerial view

- Coat of arms

- Location of Šventoji
- Coordinates: 56.0298°N 21.0812°E
- Country: Lithuania
- Ethnographic region: Samogitia
- County: Klaipėda County
- Municipality: Palanga City Municipality
- Eldership: Šventoji eldership
- Capital of: Šventoji eldership
- Time zone: UTC+2 (EET)
  - Summer (DST): UTC+3 (EEST)
- Website: http://www.sventoji.lt

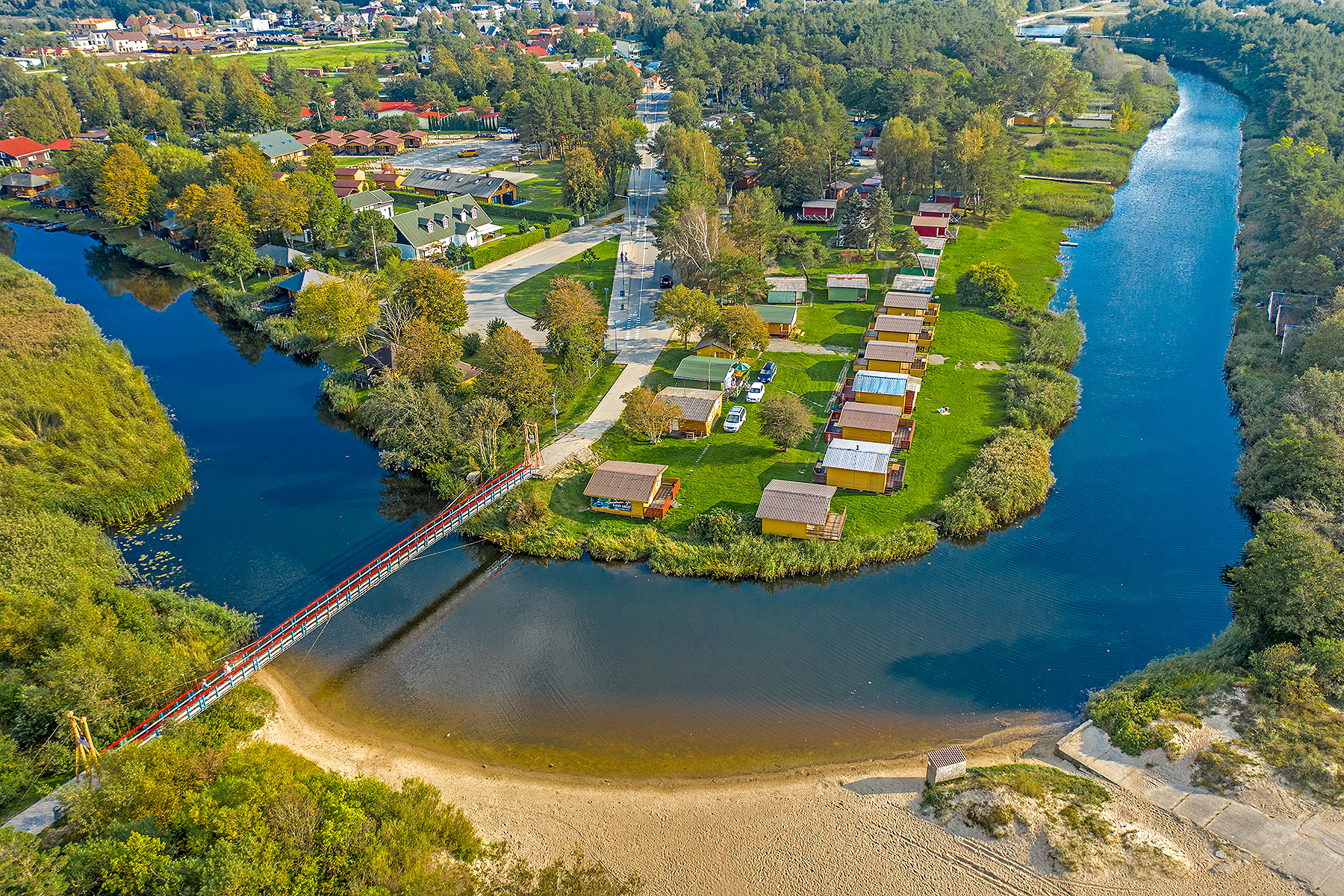
River Šventoji

Šventoji (Samogitian: Švėntuojė; Latvian: Sventāja) is a resort town on the coast of the Baltic Sea in Lithuania. Administratively it is part of Palanga City Municipality. The total population of Šventoji as of 2012 was 2631. The town is located about 12 km north of Palanga center and close to the border with Latvia. Further north of the town is Būtingė and its oil terminal. Šventoji River flows into the Baltic sea at the town. The town also has a famous lighthouse, which is located 780 meters from the sea. Its height is 39 meters. The town is a popular summer resort for families, during summer it has many cafes, restaurants and various attractions for the visitors.

== History ==
Šventoji is an important archaeological site as the first artefacts are dated about 3000 BC. A famous cane shaped as moose head was also found in the town. It is a former fishing village now turned into a tourist town. The town always struggled to develop a port, which had to compete with nearby Klaipėda and Liepāja. A larger port was constructed in the second half of the 17th century, especially since 1679, when it was leased to English merchants. It was destroyed in 1701 during the Great Northern War. During the times of the Russian Empire (1795–1915) the port was moribund.

In 1919, after the breakup of the Russian Empire, Šventoji became a part of Latvia, like the rest of the Courland Governorate. Since this time, Šventoji (together with Palanga and some other areas) was part of territorial dispute with Latvia. After unsuccessful negotiations it was decided to invoke an international arbitration. In 1921 the town was peacefully transferred to Lithuania following a Lithuanian-Latvian treaty.

After the territorial transfer, the town became crucially important for Lithuania as one of its few points of access to the sea. The sea port began developing again: two piers were constructed, but they were frequently covered in sand.

Thus, it never grew into a bigger port, although Šventoji briefly became vital to Lithuania in the brief period between the German occupation of Klaipėda (March 1939) and Lithuania's incorporation into the Soviet Union (June 1940).

== Undersea cable ==
On 17 November 2024, Arelion detected damage to its BCS East-West Interlink undersea cable with internet communications between Šventoji and Katthammarsvik at Gotland, Sweden, causing the internet capacity in Lithuania to be reduced by a fifth. According to Andrius Šemeškevičius who is the chief technology officer for Telia Lietuva, Telia has three undersea cables between Sweden and Lithuania which means that the internet bandwidth was reduced by one-third due to the incident: however, the connection was restored to users after bypassing the fault. He added that the damaged cable is quite old and there have been several faults related to it, but no cases of sabotage have been recorded so far. (Note: On 19 November 2024, the Helsinki based state controlled Finnish firm Cinia detected the C-Lion1 undersea cable which began operations in the spring of 2016 and carries internet communications between Finland at Hanko and Santahamina in Helsinki and Rostock, Germany, was severed between Gotland and Kaliningrad near the southern tip of Sweden's Oland Island. The C-Lion 1 is the only undersea cable that runs directly between Finland and Germany and central Europe. Later, Samuli Bergström, who is the communications chief at the Finnish National Cyber Security Centre (Finnish: Kyberturvallisuuskeskus) under Traficom, verified the break. The Russian telecom operator Avelacom and the data centre operators TeliaSonera and Hetzner Online use the C-Lion 1 cable. According to the Finnish government cybersecurity expert Samuli Bergstrom, internet traffic was routed to other undersea cables which prevented any reduction in internet capacity between Finland and Germany. According to Andrius Šemeškevičius, who is the chief technology officer for Telia Lietuva, the C-Lion 1 undersea cable and the undersea cable between Gotland and Šventoji intersect in an area of only 10 square meters. The C-Lion 1 undersea cable follows a similar route about several hundred metres from the Russia-to-Germany Nord Stream 1 and Nord Stream 2 natural gas pipelines which were sabotaged on 26 September 2022.) (Note: Russia has a fleet of suspected intelligence vessels including the Yantar (Russian: Янтарь), which, as of 15 November 2024, had been north of Dublin in the Irish Sea travelling with both the Russian warship Admiral Golovko and the Russian tanker Vyazma, in Nordic waters which could target undersea cables.) Following the damage to undersea cables, Royal Danish Navy vessels detained the Yi Peng 3.

== Notable people from Šventoji ==
- Evaldas Kairys (born 1990), professional basketball player
