= Virtual ISP =

Internet service provider that resells existing services

A Virtual ISP (VISP), also known as an Affinity ISP, is an Internet service provider (ISP) that resells the resources of existing ISPs under another brand name.

== History ==
The world's first Virtual ISP was pioneered by the UK arm of the Canadian Intasys Corporation (now Ace*Comm) in partnership with Easynet. Called 'Intasys Online' the VISP was launched in London in 1996 and was used primarily as a demonstration ISP for other virtual ISPs. Intasys operated successfully as a branded ISP provider providing virtual ISPs for clients until the internet arm was sold to Zygo Productions in 1998.

== Overview ==
A Virtual ISP (VISP) purchases services from another ISP (sometimes called a wholesale ISP or similar within this context) that allow the VISP's customers to access the Internet via one or more point of presence (PoPs) that are owned and operated by the wholesale ISP.

Virtual ISPs can vary from a normal ISP buying access points off a third party to a complete white label service where the branding of the VISP is usually such as to portray the image of being an ISP in their own right.

There are various models for the delivery of Virtual ISPs. As an example a wholesale ISP could provide network access to end users via its dial-up modem PoPs or DSLAMs installed in telephone exchanges, and route, switch, and/or tunnel the end-user traffic to the VISP's network, whereupon they may route the traffic toward its destination.

In another model, the wholesale ISP does not route any end-user traffic, and needs only provide AAA (Authentication, Authorization and Accounting) functions, as well as any value-add services, like email or web hosting.

A complete VISP will consist of a pure rebranding of another ISP offering where the host ISP manages all aspects of the service. This model is commonly used for charities and other affinity organisations where 'MyOrganisation' ISP is actually a virtual service on another ISP.

Any given ISP may use their own PoPs to deliver one service, and use a VISP model to deliver another service, or, use a combination to deliver a service in different areas.

The service provided by a wholesale ISP in a VISP model is distinct from that of an upstream ISP, even though, in some cases, they may both be one and the same company. The former provides connectivity from the end-user's premises to the Internet or to the end-user's ISP, and the latter provides connectivity from the end user's ISP to all or parts of the rest of the Internet.

A VISP can also be a dial-up white label service offered to anyone at no cost or for a minimal setup fee. The actual ISP providing the service generates revenue from the calls and may also share a percentage of that revenue with the owner of the VISP. All technical aspects are dealt with, leaving the owner of VISP with the task of promoting the service. This sort of service is, however, declining due to the popularity of unmetered dial-up access.

== See also ==
- Digital United
