= Cogent Communications =

Multinational internet service provider based in the United States

Cogent Communications Holdings, Inc.

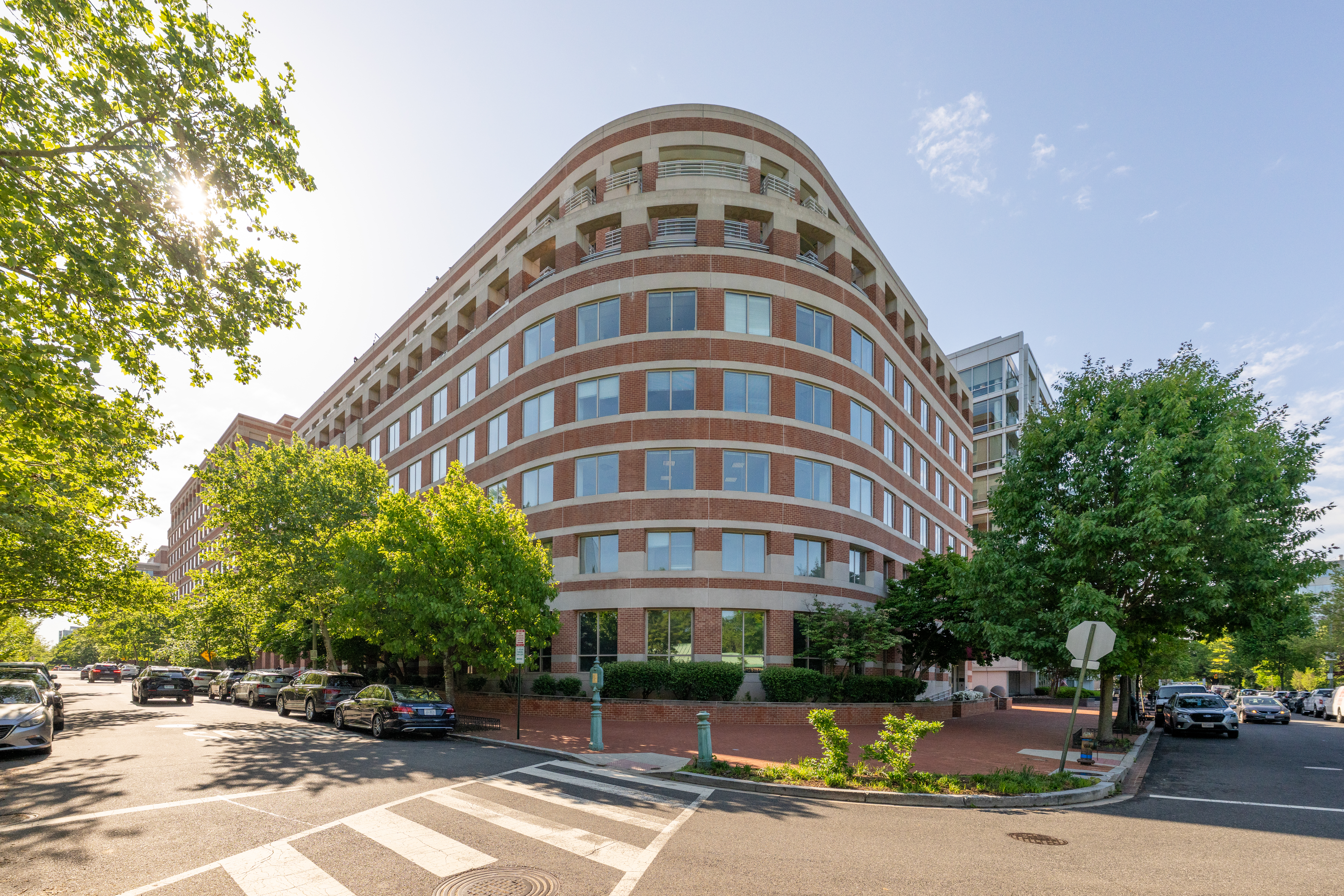
- Headquarters in Washington, D.C.
- Company type: Public
- Traded as: Nasdaq: CCOI; S&P 600 component
- Industry: Telecommunications
- Founded: 1999; 27 years ago
- Founder: David Schaeffer
- Headquarters: Washington, D.C., U.S.
- Key people: David Schaeffer (CEO); Thaddeus Weed (CFO)
- Revenue: ▲US$940.922 million (2023)
- Operating income: ▼US$(129.329) million (2023)
- Net income: ▲US$1.273 billion (2023)
- Total assets: ▲US$3.211 billion (2023)
- Total equity: ▼US$0.422 million (2023)
- Number of employees: 1,947 (2023)
- ASN: 174
- Traffic Levels: 100 Tbps+
- Website: www.cogentco.com

Cogent Communications Holdings, Inc. is a multinational internet service provider based in the United States. Cogent's primary services consist of Internet access and data transport, offered on a fiber optic, IP data-only network, along with colocation in data centers.

== Acquisition history ==
Cogent was founded in 1999 at the peak of the industry's growth and was funded by angel investors including members of Keiretsu Forum. In three years, Cogent acquired 13 other failing carriers, purchasing $14 billion in capital for $60 million, including $4 billion worth of Property, Plant and Equipment.

- September 2001 – Acquires the assets of NetRail
- February 2002 – Acquires Allied Riser
- April 2002 – Acquires Building Access Agreements from OnSite Access
- April 2002 – Acquires Major US Assets of PSINet
- September 2002 – Acquires Major Assets of FiberCity Networks
- February 2003 – Acquires Fiber Network Solutions
- May 2003 – Acquires Assets of Applied Theory
- January 2004 – Acquires LambdaNet France & Spain
- March 2004 – Acquires Fiber Network and Equipment in Germany Out of Former Carrier1 Assets
- September 2004 – Acquires Global Access
- October 2004 – Acquires Aleron Broadband
- December 2004 – Acquires NTT/Verio Dedicated Access Business in U.S.

In September, 2022, it was announced that Cogent was buying the Sprint Corporation wireline business from T-Mobile for $1.00, assuming some liabilities.

== Peering disputes ==
Cogent has been controversial in the ISP market for low bandwidth pricing and its public disputes over peering with AOL (2003), Level 3 Communications (2005), France Telecom (2006), Limelight Networks (2007), Telia Carrier (March 2008), and Sprint Nextel (October 2008).

On March 14, 2008, after Cogent stopped routing packets from European network provider Telia (AS 1299), their two networks lost mutual connectivity. The connection was reestablished March 28, 2008 with interconnection points in both the United States and Europe.

On June 6, 2011, Cogent automatically stopped peering with the US Department of Energy's Energy Sciences Network (ESnet) causing a disruption for three days.

In November 2015, CenturyLink signed a new long-term bilateral interconnection agreement with Cogent Communications.

In December 2015, Cogent sued Deutsche Telekom. Cogent claimed that DTAG failed to increase interconnection capacity between the two networks. According to a statement released by Cogent, "Deutsche Telekom has interfered with the free flow of Internet traffic between Cogent customers and Deutsche Telekom customers by refusing to increase the capacity of the interconnection ports that allow the exchange of traffic".

There is a long-running dispute between Cogent and Hurricane Electric. Cogent has been refusing to peer settlement-free with Hurricane Electric, the largest IPv6 network, since 2009. Due to this, IPv6 traffic cannot be interchanged between both networks. IPv4 traffic can still be interchanged since Hurricane Electric is only a Tier 1 operator for IPv6 but not for IPv4. IPv4 traffic between both networks is routed via Arelion.

Cogent and Google have also stopped IPv6 peering in 2016. This is rumored to be closely tied to Cogent leveraging Google's IPv4 traffic via a paid customer or to maintain settlement-free interconnect with another network. As of November 2023, the two networks appear to be reachable over IPv6 via Tata Communications.

In February 2017, Cogent blocked many piracy and streaming sites including The Pirate Bay. This was unintentional due to a poorly crafted Spanish court order.

In February 2024, Cogent withdrew peering with NTT in Europe, forcing all their peering traffic to go through their common remaining interconnections in USA, increasing latency and traffic loss between both networks, to complain against refusal of peering settlements in Asia from NTT.

In May 2024, Cogent withdrew peering with Tata Communications completely. As a result, networks that are single homed behind AS6453 (in APAC) or AS174 will not be able to reach each other. This is similar, but more serious, to the previous regional NTT-Cogent depeerings (since the NTT ones "just" increased latency by routing via the US instead). Despite what Cogent reported, Cogent has not de-peered, but rather blocked routes to TATA single-homed transit. However, in June 2024 this peering dispute was resolved. Connectivity between Cogent and TATA has been restored and is operating normally.
