= Hot-potato routing =

Internet routing policies

In Internet routing between autonomous systems that are interconnected in multiple locations, hot-potato routing is the practice of passing traffic off to another autonomous system as quickly as possible, thus using their network for wide-area transit. Cold-potato routing is the opposite, where the originating autonomous system internally forwards the packet until it is as near to the destination as possible.

== Behaviors ==
Hot-potato routing (or "closest exit routing") is the normal behavior generally employed by most ISPs. Like a hot potato in the hand, the source of the packet tries to hand it off as quickly as possible in order to minimize the burden on its network. Hot-potato routing offers operational advantages such as reduced infrastructure costs, as traffic is handed off at the nearest exit point, avoiding the need for overseas POPs or dedicated submarine-cable capacity.

Cold-potato routing (or "best exit routing"), on the other hand, requires more work from the source network, but keeps traffic under its control for longer, allowing it to offer a higher end-to-end quality of service to its users. It is prone to misconfiguration as well as poor coordination between two networks, which can result in unnecessarily circuitous paths. NSFNET used cold-potato routing in the 90s. Cold-potato routing enables providers to optimize paths based on real-time network conditions, troubleshoot issues without relying on third parties, and maintain more predictable delivery times. It also reduces the risk of packet loss due to congestion or oversubscription in external networks.

When a transit network with a hot-potato policy peers with a transit network employing cold-potato routing, traffic ratios between the two networks tend to be symmetric.

== Implementation ==
Routing behavior can be influenced using two BGP "knobs": multi-exit discriminator (MED) and local preference. In hot-potato routing, the MED attached to incoming EBGP-learned routes is discarded, and the IGP cost is used instead. In cold-potato routing, MED or BGP communities are used to signal the cost of the route, which influences IBGP local preference.
