= RouteViews =

Project to view border gateway protocol information

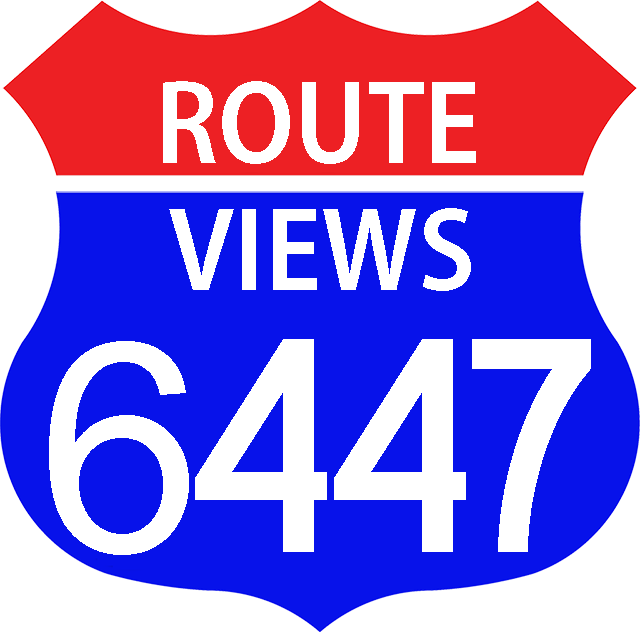
- Developer: University of Oregon
- Release: 1995
- Type: Network monitoring
- License: CC BY 4.0
- Website: www.routeviews.org

RouteViews (Note: Note that the naming has been inconsistent over the years. Often the words are together as "RouteViews". But sometimes there is a dash, as in "Route-Views" and sometimes there is a space, as in "Route Views".) is a project at the University of Oregon that collects and archives Border Gateway Protocol routing data from the global Internet. Founded in 1995 by the Advanced Network Technology Center, it was originally intended to give Internet service providers a way to see how their network prefixes appeared from other vantage points on the Internet, allowing them to debug routing problems and improve reachability. The project has since become a widely used data source for academic research, government policy work, and network security analysis. The Network Startup Resource Center (NSRC) at the University of Oregon manages the project's operations, and it is funded by the National Science Foundation and contributions from industry partners.

== Data collection ==
RouteViews collects BGP data by peering directly with network operators at Internet exchange points (IXPs) or through multi-hop BGP sessions with operators not co-located at an exchange where RouteViews has a collector. The two main types of data collected are BGP Routing Information Bases (RIBs), which are periodic snapshots of routing tables, and continuous streams of BGP update messages.

The data is stored in the Multi-Threaded Routing Toolkit (MRT) format and is made publicly available for download from archive.routeviews.org. RIB snapshots are archived approximately every two hours, while update messages are archived every 15 minutes. The archive is freely accessible through HTTP, FTP, and rsync.

As of January 2026, the RouteViews project is receiving full routes from 277 unique Autonomous System Numbers (ASNs).

== History ==
RouteViews was established in 1995 during the early deployment of BGP, the protocol used by autonomous systems to exchange routing information across the Internet. At that time, network operators had limited ability to see how their routes propagated beyond their own networks. The project began archiving IPv4 routing data in 1997 and IPv6 data in 2003.

By the early 2000s, researchers had begun using RouteViews data for purposes beyond operational troubleshooting. A 2002 paper published at SIGCOMM by Ratul Mahajan and others used RouteViews data to analyze the prevalence and effects of BGP misconfigurations across the Internet. Around the same period, a study by Craig Labovitz and others at the University of Michigan used RouteViews data to examine Internet backbone stability and failure modes.

== Relationship with RIPE RIS ==
RouteViews works alongside the RIPE Routing Information Service in Europe to provide views of global Internet routing. Together the two systems maintain over 2,500 vantage points worldwide. The platforms share similar data collection methods but have distinct geographic coverage and peering relationships.

== Use in research ==
As of 2022, RouteViews data has been cited in over 1,000 peer-reviewed papers according to an archive maintained by the project. Research using the data has covered topics including Internet topology mapping, autonomous system relationship inference, BGP anomaly detection (such as route hijacking and route leaks), and routing policy analysis.

=== Internet topology and visualization ===
The Cooperative Association for Internet Data Analysis (CAIDA) at the University of California, San Diego has used RouteViews data to produce prefix-to-AS mappings since 2008, and continues to maintain this dataset. CAIDA's AS Rank tool, which infers the relative importance and relationships of autonomous systems on the Internet, also uses RouteViews as a source of topological data.

=== Routing security ===
RouteViews data has been used in studies of routing security, including the detection of prefix hijacking. A 2007 study published by the Association for Computing Machinery (ACM) examined prefix hijacking and interception on the Internet using data from RouteViews.

== Mentions in Media ==
Researcher Barrett Lyon used the full RouteViews archive, covering IPv4 data from 1997 and IPv6 data from 2003, to produce animated visualizations of Internet growth as part of the Opte Project. The visualizations were the subject of reporting by Wired magazine. A separate Wired article in 2023 on IPv6 adoption also drew on RouteViews data.

An APNIC podcast in 2024 featuring George Michaelson and Doug Madory discussed the opportunities and challenges of measuring BGP and RPKI deployment using RouteViews data.

== See also ==
- Border Gateway Protocol
- Internet exchange point
- Resource Public Key Infrastructure
- Autonomous system (Internet)
- Internet routing
