= RETN Networks =

British Internet Service providing company

RETN
- Type: Private
- Industry: Telecommunication
- Founded: 2003 in London, United Kingdom
- Founder: Dmitry Samarin
- Headquarters: 5 Greenwich View Place, Millharbour, London, United Kingdom
- Number of locations: 16+ offices
- Area served: 45 countries (Europe, Asia, United States)
- Key people: Tony O’Sullivan (CEO)
- Products: Ethernet VPN (EVPN); Remote IX; Colocation; DDoS mitigation; IP transit
- Services: Ethernet and VPN solutions; Capacity services; Remote peering; Cloud connectivity; Managed Global Private Network; BGP solutions; Cybersecurity solutions
- Number of employees: 170
- Website: retn.net

RETN Networks Limited is a British network service provider headquartered in London, United Kingdom. Founded in 2003, RETN operates a high-capacity backbone network that spans over 142,000 kilometres with more than 1,010 Points of Presence across Europe, Asia, and the United States. It is the 12th largest Internet service provider globally based on customer cone size according to AS rank.

== History ==
RETN originated in 2002 as a joint project of Saint Petersburg operators PeterStar and Eltel to connect the Russian internet to Western Europe. A point of presence was opened in Helsinki in 2003. The first RETN Ltd was incorporated in London, UK.

In 2008, RETN announced a pan-European ring connecting Russia to Europe via Scandinavia and Ukraine; at the beginning of 2008, RETN leased fiber from the Helsinki-FI/RU border and launched its own DWDM communication line from Helsinki to St. Petersburg, providing the first redundant connection between European Russia and major European internet exchanges (IXP). Internet traffic on the RETN network grew exponentially. This served as the basis for a much more ambitious project – the construction of a Pan-European ring network: Stockholm – Helsinki – St. Petersburg – Moscow – Kyiv – Budapest – Vienna – Frankfurt – Amsterdam – Hamburg – Copenhagen – Stockholm and Amsterdam – London – Paris – Frankfurt (over 10,000 km), which RETN implemented in 2009–2011.

In January 2021, O'Sullivan succeeded Samarin as CEO; Samarin first remained as Chairman and then recently transitioned to Chief Technology Officer.

== Services ==
RETN provides a wide range of connectivity services for wholesale and content and enterprise customers. These include IP transit, Ethernet and VPN solutions, capacity services, remote peering to major Internet Exchange Points (IXPs), colocation, DDoS Mitigation, cloud connectivity and Flex IX. For enterprise customers, the company offers Managed Global Private Network solutions, BGP solutions, One Port services, and cybersecurity solutions.

RETN network connects major global telecommunications hubs to the Eurasian region and is based on dual platforms: Dense Wavelength Division Multiplexing (DWDM) and Internet Protocol/Multiprotocol Label Switching (IP/MPLS). The network extends through Western and Eastern Europe, reaching the border with China and Southeast Asia via terrestrial routes. RETN relies on equipment from leading manufacturers such as HPE Juniper Networking, Nokia, and Ciena to maintain high performance and reliability.

It has more than 16 offices across Europe and Asia including in London, Frankfurt, Amsterdam, Milan, Singapore and Hong Kong, The current CEO of the company is Tony O’Sullivan

RETN has partnerships with Internet Exchange Points, including DE-CIX, LINX, ESpanix, BIX and Namex.
