= CERFnet =

Early California-based Internet service provider

- Native name: California Education and Research Federation Network
- Company type: Network service provider
- Industry: Telecommunications, Internet services
- Founded: 1988; 38 years ago
- Founder: Susan Estrada
- Defunct: c. 1998 (absorbed into AT&T)
- Headquarters: San Diego, California, United States
- Parent: San Diego Supercomputer Center / General Atomics (1988–c. 1996); Teleport Communications Group (c. 1996–1998); AT&T (1998–)

The California Education and Research Federation Network (CERFnet) was one of the earliest Internet service providers in the United States and a pioneering regional network of the NSFNET. Founded in 1988 by Susan Estrada at the San Diego Supercomputer Center (SDSC), CERFnet connected academic, government, and industrial research institutions across California and played a significant role in the commercialization of the Internet. It was a co-founder of the Commercial Internet eXchange (CIX) in 1991, one of the first exchange points to permit unrestricted commercial Internet traffic.

== Name ==
The network was originally to be named "SURFnet", a reference to San Diego's surfing culture, but the name was already in use by SURFnet in the Netherlands. The organizers instead chose the acronym CERF, standing for California Education and Research Federation, which also served as an homage to Vint Cerf, one of the co-creators of TCP/IP and a widely recognized pioneer of the Internet. Cerf gave his permission to use the name, and in July 1989 he and Estrada formally launched the network by smashing a bottle of glitter over a Cisco router at the San Diego Supercomputer Center.

== History ==
=== Founding and NSF funding ===
In 1985-1986, Susan Estrada installed a 56 Kbps wide-area network for the San Diego Supercomputer Center and subsequently helped connect the NSF-funded supercomputer centers at 1.5 Mbps (T-1) speeds. In January 1988, she proposed CERFnet as a regional network to bring high-speed Internet connectivity to California's research and educational institutions. In June 1988, a formal proposal was submitted by the SDSC and General Atomics to the National Science Foundation.

In March 1989, the NSF awarded $2.8 million to establish the network.

=== Network deployment ===
CERFnet's high-speed backbone nodes were installed between May and June 1989 at the University of California, Los Angeles (UCLA), the University of California, Irvine (UCI), the San Diego Supercomputer Center, and the California Institute of Technology (Caltech). By November 1989, the network was fully operational, linking 38 California research centres. The backbone was extended to the University of California Office of the President in Oakland in November 1989 and to San Jose in December 1990.

CERFnet's backbone used the TCP/IP protocol suite and relied on Cisco Systems routers throughout its infrastructure—a choice that Estrada later noted represented approximately ten per cent of Cisco's gross revenue for 1988. One of CERFnet's earliest commercial customers was the then-startup Qualcomm.

=== Commercial Internet and the CIX ===
Under Estrada's leadership as executive director, CERFnet grew from 25 initial sites to over 300 connected research and education centres. The network developed several notable innovations, including the first deployment of dial-up IP connectivity (branded as "DIAL n' CERF"), accounting and usage reports for customers, and 24/7 network monitoring.

In March 1991, CERFnet, together with PSINet and UUNET (AlterNet), co-founded the Commercial Internet eXchange (CIX). The CIX was an Internet exchange point that allowed the free exchange of commercial TCP/IP traffic between Internet service providers without the restrictions of the NSFNET acceptable use policy, marking a crucial step in the commercialisation of the Internet.

CERFnet also promoted community Internet access through initiatives such as "Adopt A School", launched in September 1991, which enabled CERFnet users to connect local K-12 schools to dial-up Internet service. The network published The Adventures of Captain Internet and CERF Boy, a comic book featuring a female superhero character, beginning in October 1991, as part of efforts to publicise and humanise the Internet for new audiences.

=== InterNIC role ===
In 1993, the National Science Foundation established InterNIC (Internet Network Information Center) to provide essential Internet-related services. The contract was divided among three organisations: Network Solutions (registration services), AT&T (directory and database services), and General Atomics/CERFnet (information services). General Atomics was removed from the contract in December 1994 after a review found its services did not conform to the required standards; its InterNIC functions were subsequently assumed by AT&T.
