= Katthammarsvik =

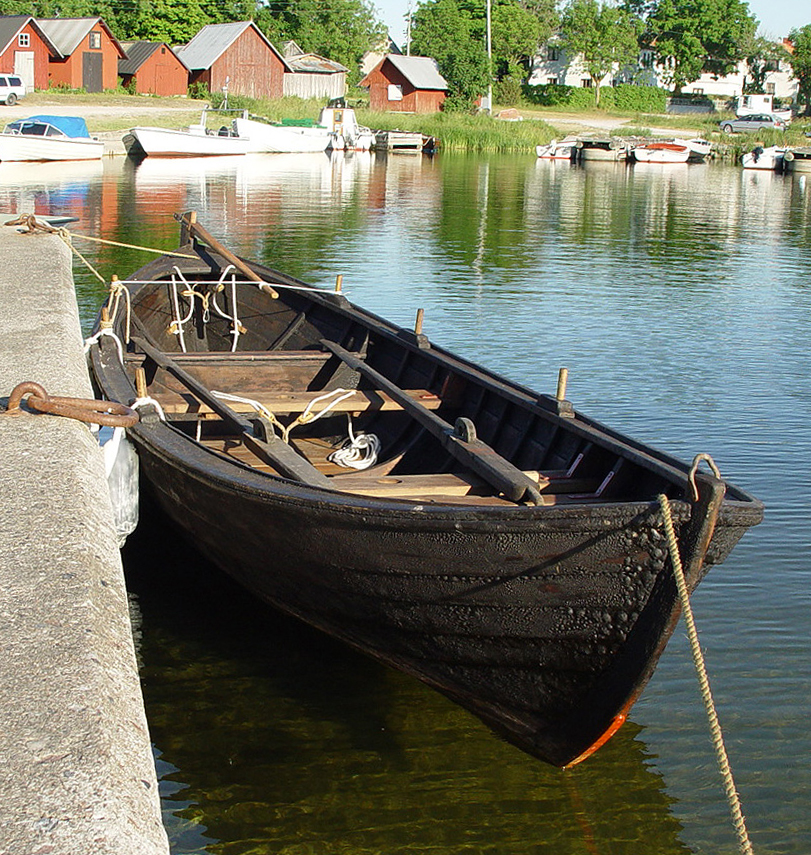
- Katthammarsvik harbor

- Location within Gotland
- Coordinates: 57°26.054′N 18°50.882′E
- Country: Sweden
- Province: Gotland
- County: Gotland County
- Municipality: Gotland Municipality

Area
  - Total: 0.70 km^{2} (0.27 sq mi)

Population (2005-12-31)
  - Total: 176
  - Density: 253/km^{2} (660/sq mi)
- Time zone: UTC+1 (CET)
  - Summer (DST): UTC+2 (CEST)

Katthammarsvik (Swedish pronunciation: [kathamaʂˈviːk]) is a harbour settlement in Östergarn socken on the island of Gotland, Sweden.
As of 2005, it was in statistical terms defined as a småort (small locality) and has formerly, very briefly, held the status of a tätort (locality). The BCS East-West Interlink undersea cable carrying internet traffic comes ashore at Katthammarsvik.

== History ==
Katthammarsvik had a limestone industry consisting of several kilns that flourished after Gotland came under Swedish rule in 1645. Burnt lime, limestone and wood products were shipped from the harbour at Katthammarsvik.

Katthamra Manor (Katthamra gård) not far from the harbor, is of medieval origin but flourished and was expanded during the time of the limestone industry in the 18th and 19th century.

With 196 inhabitants, Katthammarsvik was defined as a småort (small locality) in 1990. After a rise in population to 220 in 1995, Statistics Sweden redefined it as a locality. In 2000, the population was down to 182 people and it was again defined as a small locality In 2005, the population had sunk to 176.
