= Latency =

Latency or latent may refer to:

== Engineering ==
- Latency (engineering), a measure of the time delay experienced by a system
  - Latency (audio), the delay between the moment an audio signal is triggered and the moment it is produced or received
  - Mechanical latency

== Music ==
- The Latency, a Canadian pop rock band
- Latency (band), a South Korean girl band

== Psychology ==
- Latency stage, a stage of psychosexual development in a child

== See also ==
- Ping (video games), a similar concept
