= Wireless Commons License =

License describing open wireless community networks

The Wireless Commons License describes the principles, terms and conditions for many libre and open wireless community networks. In summary it gives the right to use the network for any purpose unless you affect the operation of the network or the freedom of other users, the right to know and learn any detail of the network and its components, the freedom of joining or extending the network following the same conditions.

Community networks following this license are used, owned, operated, extended and governed by the community, the same group people with no separation between service providers and users. It can be seen as an equivalent license for libre and open wireless community networks compared to software licenses for libre and open software.
