= Šventoji (Baltic) =

River in Lithuania and Latvia

Coordinates: 56°1′42″N 21°4′24″E

Šventoji, Sventāja
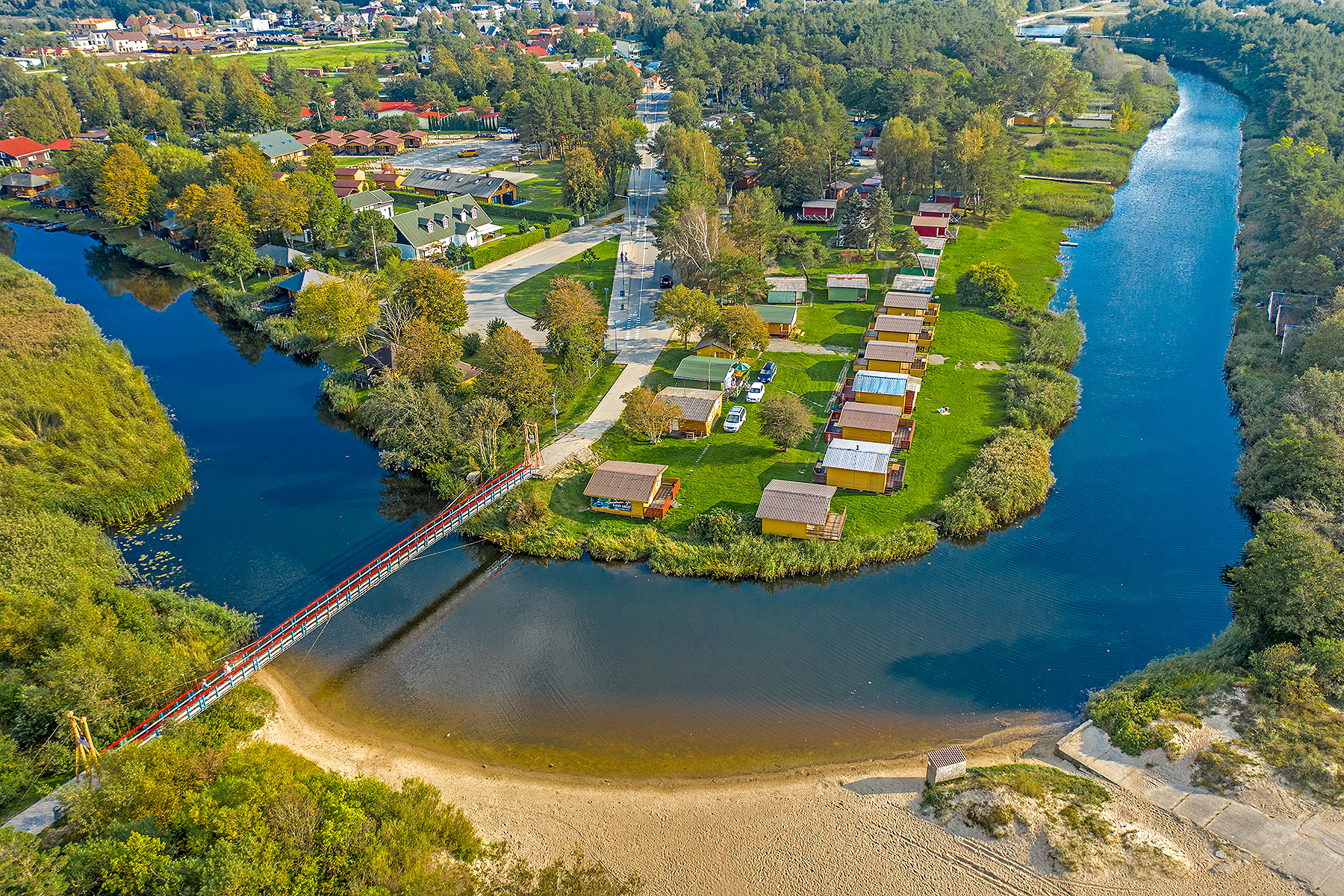
- River Šventoji near Šventoji settlement in Lithuania

Location
- Country: Lithuania, Latvia

Physical characteristics
- Source
  - location: Skuodas district, Lithuania
- Mouth
  - location: Baltic Sea
- Length: 73 km (45 mi)
- Basin size: 472 km^{2} (182 sq mi)
- Discharge
  - average: 5.38 m^{3}/s (190 cu ft/s)

The Šventoji (Latvian: Sventāja) is a river in the northwest of Lithuania and southwest of Latvia. It begins in Skuodas district and flows for 30km on the international border between Latvia and Lithuania. The Šventoji flows into the Baltic Sea near Šventoji settlement, north of Palanga. Būtingė oil terminal lies near the mouth.
