= Interconnect agreement =

Agreement between network service providers to connect their networks

An interconnect agreement is a business contract between telecommunications organizations for the purpose of interconnecting their networks and exchanging telecommunications traffic. Interconnect agreements are found both in the public switched telephone network and the Internet.

In the public switched telephone network, an interconnect agreement invariably involves settlement fees based on call source and destination, connection times and duration, when these fees do not cancel out between operators.

On the Internet, where the concept of a "call" is generally hard to define, settlement-free peering and Internet transit are common forms of interconnection. A contract for interconnection within the Internet is usually called a peering agreement.

Interconnect agreements are typically complex contractual agreements involving payment schemes and schedules, coordination of routing policies, acceptable use policies, traffic balancing requirements, technical standards, coordination of network operations, dispute resolution, etc. Legal and regulatory requirements are often an issue. For example, network operators may be forced by law to interconnect with their competitors. In the United States, the Telecommunications Act of 1996 mandated methods of interconnection and the compensation models for doing so.
