= PSINet =

Defunct but one of the first commercial Internet service providers (ISPs)

- Type: Public
- Traded as: Nasdaq: PSIX
- Industry: Telecommunication
- Founded: 1989; 37 years ago, in Ashburn, Virginia, United States
- Founder: William Schrader; Martin Schoffstall
- Defunct: April 2002; 24 years ago
- Fate: Acquired by Cogent Communications
- Headquarters: Ashburn, Virginia, United States
- Website: PSINet.com (archive)

PSINet, formerly Performance Systems International, was an American internet service provider based in Ashburn, Virginia. As one of the first commercial Internet service providers (ISPs), it was involved in the commercialization of the Internet until the company's bankruptcy in 2001 during the dot-com bubble and subsequent acquisition by Cogent Communications in 2002.

It was founded on December 5, 1989, and began offering services, including limited for-profit access to the Internet, on January 1, 1990, becoming one of the first companies to sell Internet connectivity.

== History ==
=== Founding ===
PSINet was founded in 1989 by Martin L. Schoffstall and William L. Schrader, who initially funded the company through personal loans, including using credit cards and by selling the family car. It was initially known as Performance Systems International. In very late 1989, the company acquired NYSERNet assets and established an ongoing outsourcing contract with NYSERNet. NYSERNet, a non-profit research and education network serving New York State, had created one of the first regional Internet networks under Schrader's and Richard Mandelbaum's leadership and technical leadership from Schoffstall, Mark Fedor, and others. This acquisition gave PSINet commercial access to what would come to be known as the Internet.

=== Commercialization ===
Before 1990, the Internet had been largely funded by government agencies including DARPA (the original and still existing at that time, ARPANET), the National Science Foundation (NSF) for NSFNET, various U.S. federal agency networks such as the Department of Energy and NASA, and with grants to various regional networks including NYSERNet. Many of the stake-holders of the Internet of the 1980s were military, industrial, or academic researchers who were largely satisfied with the then current model of usage and governance. However, appropriate commercial usage policies were debated on such mailing lists as com-priv (commercialization and privatization of the Internet), within semi-public forums such as the Internet Engineering Task Force (IETF), and included an investigation by the NSF's Inspector General staff. This included an intense debate on the "settlement model" of the Internet which was worldwide and both public and private in scope.

The NSF's appropriations act authorized NSF to "foster and support the development and use of computer and other scientific and engineering methods and technologies, primarily for research and education in the sciences and engineering." This allowed NSF to support NSFNET and related networking initiatives, but only to the extent that that support was "primarily for research and education in the sciences and engineering." And this in turn was taken to mean that use of NSFNET for commercial purposes was not allowed.

At the time the National Science Foundation (NSF) believed in a settlement model based on usage, with payments or contributions based on how much data was sent or received, mirroring the public X.25 networks at that time. Such a settlement policy would allow research and education and commercial traffic to share a common network infrastructure without using NSF funds to support the commercial use. NSF in fact entered into an agreement with the non-profit Advanced Network and Services to allow commercial traffic through a for-profit subsidiary, ANS CO+RE (commercial plus research), subject to the conditions (i) that the NSFNET Backbone Service was not diminished; (ii) that ANS CO+RE recovered at least the average cost of the commercial traffic traversing the network; and (iii) that any excess revenues recovered above the cost of carrying the commercial traffic would be placed into an infrastructure pool to be distributed by an allocation committee broadly representative of the networking community to enhance and extend national and regional networking infrastructure and support.

PSINet through Schrader, Schoffstall, Rick Adams of UUNET, Mitch Kapor, and others waged an intense policy battle that the Internet needed a fixed access payment strategy to ensure that the ultimate utility of the Internet become available to all.

=== Initial public offering ===
PSINet eventually took venture capital investment from Matrix Partners, Sigma Partners, and Amerindo as a private entity to grow the company throughout the US and then outside of the country. On May 1, 1995, the initial public offering listed its shares on the NASDAQ stock exchange under symbol PSIX.

=== Growth ===
The company met with early success, capitalizing on the growing potential of the growing global network, an expansion in which the company played an active role. In 1991, PSINet, UUNET (AlterNet) and General Atomics (CERFnet) co-founded the Commercial Internet eXchange (CIX), a trade association of Internet Service Providers. By 1995, the company had revenues of $32.9 million.

Pressured by increasing competition in the dial-up internet market, the company restructured in 1996 to focus on its commercial Internet business, selling its retail ISP accounts to MindSpring in June of that year, and began its expansion into Europe. Co-founder Schoffstall left the company that year. As a leader in the ISP arena, PSINet was frequently mentioned in trade publications for its accomplishments and reputation, some of it not flattering. For example, Interactive Week, a trade publication that covered the nascent Internet industry, mentioned the reputation of the PSINet sales force as being "Hitler Youth" because of its relatively young and inexperienced sales force and sales management which were very abrupt and inflexible with customers. In 1997, the company raised $1 billion in bond capital and undertook a series of rapid acquisitions, making 76 acquisitions between January 1998 and December 2000. Regional ISPs were a frequent purchase, and according to Congressional testimony by CEO Schrader, the company was by 1999 the largest independent facilities-based ISP in the United States, the second largest ISP in Japan, and had more than 500 points of presence around the world.

In an attempt to generate more brand recognition, in 1999 PSINet committed $100 million for naming rights of the Baltimore Ravens' new stadium in Baltimore, Maryland. Following PSINet's insolvency, naming rights were renegotiated and the stadium is now called M&T Bank Stadium.

The company's largest acquisition came in March 2000 with the purchase for more than $1.3 billion in stock of Houston-based Metamor Worldwide, a consulting services conglomerate it purchased in an effort to become a "single-source provider" for IT outsourcing services. The company also invested heavily in its fiber-optic network, anticipating strong demand, and planned in early 2000 to invest $1.4 billion over three years to build to expand its services and operations.

=== Collapse ===
Despite its rapid growth and significant position in the commercial Internet services market, the company was never profitable. An inexperienced management team had been replaced in March of 2000 by a seasoned team of professional managers from companies like MCI. Its acquisition spree was too overwhelming for them to manage and in addition to the executives with a voice-based telecom background (circuit-switched) they did not completely understand the nuances of a packet switched network. It was a popular stock with analysts during most of the dot-com boom because of its rapid revenue growth and aggressive expansion plans, but by 2000, PSINet was beginning to struggle. The company lost more than $5 billion in 2000 despite having close to doubled annual revenues to $995 million. Some analysts point to the Metamor acquisition as the turning point for the company, burdening it with the demands of integrating business operations while it was already struggling with significant debt from its earlier acquisitions, and facing a general slowdown in the computer services industry. However, the company had missed earnings estimates the year before, and was said to be looking to sell parts of its operation in late 1999.

A portion of it was spun out into the independent company, Inter.net, www.inter.net, which had a presence in 14 countries and took over the consumer customer base. Many of the Inter.net subsidiaries have become part of other companies, such as green.ch in Switzerland, GMO in Japan, and Uniserve in Canada. Another portion, ShellTown, was sold to Saugus.net.

A wave of senior officers, including the company's president, chief operating officer, and an executive vice president, departed the company in early 2001, and Schrader left his CEO job on April 30. In the internal email sent to staff announcing his departure he likened the company's situation to a building in a lightning storm and, referring to his decision to resign as CEO, said "I am that lightning rod". The company's stock price plunged in response to the departures and to wider-than-expected losses: the stock, which had traded as high as $60.94 a share in 2000 (after a split), closed at 18 cents in late March 2001.

In May 2001, the company was delisted from NASDAQ because the company's stock had traded below one dollar for 30 consecutive days. The company delayed filing its quarterly 10-Q filing with the U.S. Securities and Exchange Commission. Finally, overwhelmed by debts in excess of $3.7 billion and with dwindling cash reserves, the company announced on June 1, 2001, that it had filed for Chapter 11 bankruptcy protection along with 24 of its US subsidiaries, and that four of its Canadian subsidiaries had filed for protection under Canada's Companies' Creditors Arrangement Act (CCAA).

Resellers for PSInet became listed creditors owed money by PSINet for their sales commissions in bankruptcy proceedings, eventually getting payouts that were less than pennies on the dollar.

Most of the PSINet United States's assets were acquired by Cogent Communications in April 2002. PSINet Canada was acquired by TELUS Communications. PSINet Europe was acquired by Interoute in 2005. Telstra Europe Limited acquired the UK business of PSINet Europe in 2004.
