= Internet transit =

Service to connect ISP to the larger Internet

Internet transit is the service of allowing network traffic to cross or "transit" a computer network, usually used to connect a smaller Internet service provider (ISP) to the larger Internet. Technically, it consists of two bundled services:

- The advertisement of customer routes to other ISPs, thereby soliciting inbound traffic toward the customer from them
- The advertisement of other ISPs' routes (usually but not necessarily in the form of a default route or a full set of routes to all of the destinations on the Internet) to the ISP's customer, thereby soliciting outbound traffic from the customer towards these networks.

Diagram of transit (red lines; arrows indicate direction of payment) and peering (green lines) interrelationships between the four types of Autonomous Systems (ASes) of which the Internet is composed. Type 1 networks have "single homed" transit, while type 2 networks have "multi-homed" transit.

In the 1970s and early 1980s-era Internet, the assumption was made that all networks would provide full transit for one another. In the modern private-sector Internet, two forms of interconnect agreements exist between Internet networks: transit, and peering. Transit is distinct from peering, in which only traffic between the two ISPs and their downstream customers is exchanged and neither ISP can see upstream routes over the peering connection. A transit free network uses only peering; a network that uses only unpaid peering and connects to the whole Internet is considered a Tier 1 network. In the 1990s, the network access point concept provided one form of transit.

Pricing for the internet transit varies at different times and geographical locations. The transit service is typically priced per megabit per second per month, and customers are often required to commit to a minimum volume of bandwidth, and usually to a minimum term of service as well, usually using a 95th percentile burstable billing scheme. Some transit agreements provide "service-level agreements" which purport to offer money-back guarantees of performance between the customer's Internet connection and specific points on the Internet, typically major Internet exchange points within a continental geography such as North America. These service level agreements still provide only best-effort delivery since they do not guarantee service the other half of the way, from the Internet exchange point to the final destination.

== See also ==
- Commercial Internet eXchange (CIX)
- Federal Internet Exchange (FIX)
- Internet exchange point (IXP)
