= Arelion =

Swedish tier 1 Internet service provider

- Formerly: Telia Carrier; TeliaSonera International Carrier
- Industry: Telecommunications
- Founded: 1993
- Headquarters: Solna, Stockholm, Sweden
- Area served: Europe, Asia, Americas
- Key people: Daniel Kurgan (CEO)
- Products: International wholesale telecommunications and IP services
- Parent: Polhem Infra
- ASN: 1299
- Traffic Levels: 100+ Tbps
- Website: www.arelion.com

Arelion, formerly named Telia Carrier and TeliaSonera International Carrier (TSIC), is a provider of telecommunication services based in Solna, Sweden. Arelion is a tier 1 network provider, assigned Autonomous System number AS1299. Since 2021, the name Twelve99 is also used in technical contexts.

== History ==
Telia Company started building its carrier network in 1993, which became TeliaSonera International Carrier after merging with Finnish Sonera.

On 19 April 2016, the carrier was rebranded to Telia Carrier, together with its parent company dropping the "Sonera" part of its name.

On 6 October 2020, Telia Company agreed to sell its Telia Carrier unit to Polhem Infra for roughly US$1 billion. The sale was completed on 1 June 2021.

Related to the purchase, Telia Carrier begun moving from telia.net to a new domain name twelve99.net for technical uses. The domain name is a reference to Telia's AS number 1299.

On 19 January 2022, Telia Carrier rebranded to Arelion.

== Services ==
The core business of Arelion is to provide fiber-based telecommunications services and infrastructure. The company is an IP connectivity supplier ranked number one globally according to Kentik Market Intelligence. It also provides services to operators, content providers enterprises, education and online gaming networks.

The company owns and operates a large fiber network, spanning 75,000 km and connecting 320 points of presence spread across more than 120 cities in 35 countries as of March 2021. The network is centrally managed and monitored and optimized from Network Operations Centers 24/7/365.

== Customers ==
The company's customer base is mainly wholesale and includes the telecoms service providers ViaSat and Rostelecom, the content providers Facebook, Twitch, Activision Blizzard, and the content delivery networks CDNetworks. In May 2012, Arelion announced it had been selected to build and manage a pan-European optical network for Facebook. The multi-terabit optical network will allow Facebook to serve users in Africa, Middle East and Europe from a data center in Luleå, Sweden, near the Arctic Circle.

== First terabit optical trial ==
In November 2011 Arelion and Infinera announced completion of the world's first Terabit optical transmission based on 500Gbit/s super-channels. The demonstration was performed on 1105 km of optical fiber between Los Angeles and San Jose, California. The trial was conducted with elements of the new Infinera DTN-X platform and demonstrated twice the capacity of previous trials by adding a terabit of bandwidth to a route carrying 300Gbit/s production capacity.

== Corporate community support ==
Since 2008, Arelion has donated free service to the Wikimedia Foundation, being the only global tier 1 carrier to do so, as of February 2012.
