= Internet service provider =

Organization that provides access to the internet

Internet connectivity options from end-user to tier 3/2 ISPs

An internet service provider (ISP) is an organization that provides a myriad of services related to accessing, using, managing, or participating in the internet. ISPs can be organized in various forms, such as commercial, community-owned, non-profit, or otherwise privately owned.

Internet services typically provided by ISPs can include internet access, internet transit, domain name registration, web hosting, and colocation.

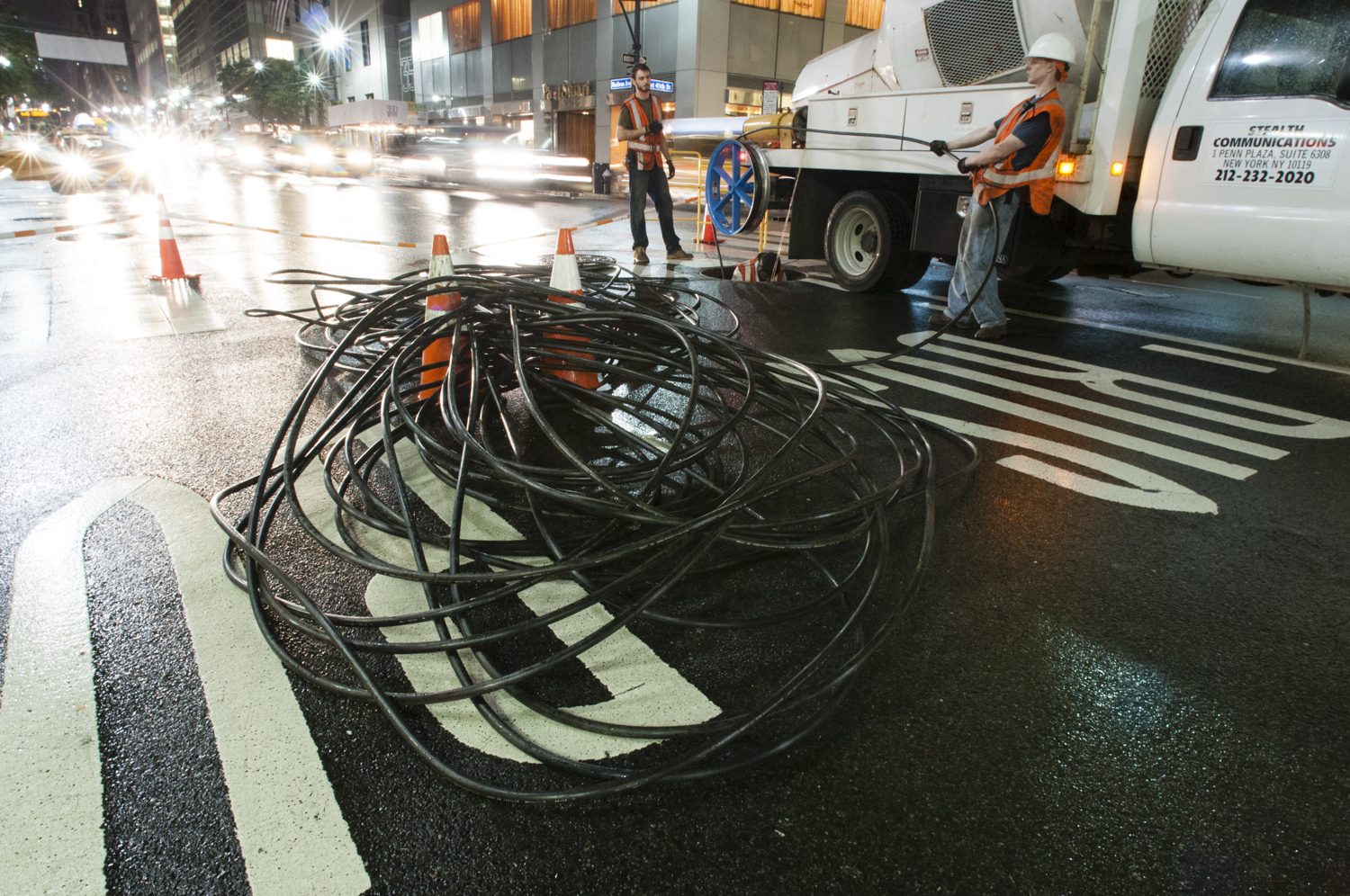
Stealth Communications in Manhattan installing fiber for providing internet access

== History ==
The internet (originally ARPAnet) was developed as a network between government research laboratories and participating departments of universities. Other companies and organizations joined by direct connection to the backbone, or by arrangements through other connected companies, sometimes using dial-up tools such as UUCP. By the late 1980s, a process was set in place towards public, commercial use of the internet. Some restrictions were removed by 1991, shortly after the introduction of the World Wide Web.

During the 1980s, online service providers such as CompuServe, Prodigy, and America Online (AOL) began to offer limited capabilities to access the internet, such as e-mail interchange, but full access to the internet was not readily available to the general public.

In 1989, the first internet service providers, companies offering the public direct access to the internet for a monthly fee, were established in Australia and the United States. In Brookline, Massachusetts, The World became the first commercial ISP in the US. Its first customer was served in November 1989. These companies generally offered dial-up connections, using the public telephone network to provide last-mile connections to their customers. The barriers to entry for dial-up ISPs were low and many providers emerged.

However, cable television companies and the telephone carriers already had wired connections to their customers and could offer internet connections at much higher speeds than dial-up using broadband technology such as cable modems and digital subscriber line (DSL). As a result, these companies often became the dominant ISPs in their service areas, and what was once a highly competitive ISP market became effectively a monopoly or duopoly in countries with a commercial telecommunications market, such as the United States.

In 1995, NSFNET was decommissioned, removing the last restrictions on the use of the internet to carry commercial traffic and network access points were created to allow peering arrangements between commercial ISPs.

ISPs can be lucrative targets for cybercrime, specifically for data breach exploitation where combinations of email addresses and passwords can be stolen. In 2026, six ISPs in Japan were hacked, impacting up to 14,000,000 customers; neither the criminal entity nor the ultimate impact of this breach have yet been determined.

=== Net neutrality ===
On 23 April 2014, the U.S. Federal Communications Commission (FCC) was reported to be considering a new rule permitting ISPs to offer content providers a faster track to send content, thus reversing their earlier net neutrality position. A possible solution to net neutrality concerns may be municipal broadband, according to Professor Susan Crawford, a legal and technology expert at Harvard Law School. On 15 May 2014, the FCC decided to consider two options regarding internet services: first, permit fast and slow broadband lanes, thereby compromising net neutrality; and second, reclassify broadband as a telecommunications service, thereby preserving net neutrality. On 10 November 2014, President Barack Obama recommended that the FCC reclassify broadband internet service as a telecommunications service in order to preserve net neutrality. On 16 January 2015, Republicans presented legislation, in the form of a U.S. Congress H.R. discussion draft bill, that makes concessions to net neutrality but prohibits the FCC from accomplishing the goal or enacting any further regulation affecting internet service providers. On 31 January 2015, AP News reported that the FCC will present the notion of applying ("with some caveats") Title II (common carrier) of the Communications Act of 1934 to the internet in a vote expected on 26 February 2015. Adoption of this notion would reclassify internet service from one of information to one of the telecommunications and, according to Tom Wheeler, chairman of the FCC, ensure net neutrality. The FCC was expected to enforce net neutrality in its vote, according to The New York Times.

On 26 February 2015, the FCC ruled in favor of net neutrality by adopting Title II (common carrier) of the Communications Act of 1934 and Section 706 in the Telecommunications Act of 1996 to the internet. The FCC Chairman, Tom Wheeler, commented, "This is no more a plan to regulate the internet than the First Amendment is a plan to regulate free speech. They both stand for the same concept." On 12 March 2015, the FCC released the specific details of the net neutrality rules. On 13 April 2015, the FCC published the final rule on its new "Net Neutrality" regulations. These rules went into effect on 12 June 2015.

Upon becoming FCC chairman in April 2017, Ajit Pai proposed an end to net neutrality, awaiting votes from the commission. On 21 November 2017, Pai announced that a vote will be held by FCC members on 14 December 2017 on whether to repeal the policy. On 11 June 2018, the repeal of the FCC's network neutrality rules took effect.

=== Provisions for low-income families ===
Since December 31, 2021, The Affordable Connectivity Program has given households in the U.S. at or below 200% of the Federal Poverty Guidelines or households that meet a number of other criteria an up to $30 per month discount toward Internet service, or up to $75 per month on certain tribal lands.

== Classifications ==
=== Access providers ===
Access provider ISPs provide Internet access directly to end customers such as businesses and consumers, employing a range of technologies to connect users to their network. Available technologies have ranged from computer modems with acoustic couplers to telephone lines, to television cable (CATV), Wi-Fi, and fiber optics.

For users and small businesses, traditional options include copper wires to provide dial-up, DSL, typically asymmetric digital subscriber line (ADSL), cable modem or Integrated Services Digital Network (ISDN) (typically basic rate interface). Using fiber-optics to end users is called Fiber To The Home or similar names.

Customers with more demanding requirements (such as medium-to-large businesses, or other ISPs) can use higher-speed DSL (such as single-pair high-speed digital subscriber line), Ethernet, metropolitan Ethernet, gigabit Ethernet, Frame Relay, ISDN Primary Rate Interface, Asynchronous Transfer Mode (ATM), synchronous optical networking (SONET) or MPLS over OTN. Dedicated internet access (DIA) services for businesses can be delivered using PON networks.

Wireless access is another option, including cellular and satellite Internet access. Access providers may have an MPLS (Multiprotocol label switching) or formerly a SONET backbone network, and have a ring or mesh network topology in their core network. The networks run by access providers can be considered wide area networks. ISPs can have access networks, aggregation networks/aggregation layers/distribution layers/edge routers/metro networks and a core network/backbone network; each subsequent network handles more traffic than the last. Mobile service providers also have similar networks. These providers often buy capacity on submarine cables to connect to Internet exchanges and engage in private peering with other carriers and networks including Tier 1 carriers at data centers, for example by connecting to the NAP of the Americas, a data center which connects many Latin American ISPs with networks in the US.

=== Mailbox providers ===
A mailbox provider is an organization that provides services for hosting electronic mail domains with access to storage for mailboxes. It provides email servers to send, receive, accept, and store email for end users or other organizations.

Many mailbox providers are also access providers, but some are not (e.g., Gmail, Yahoo! Mail, Outlook.com, AOL Mail, Po box). The definition given in RFC 6650 covers email hosting services, as well as the relevant departments of companies, universities, organizations, groups, and individuals that manage their mail servers themselves. The task is typically accomplished by implementing Simple Mail Transfer Protocol (SMTP) and possibly providing access to messages through Internet Message Access Protocol (IMAP), the Post Office Protocol, Webmail, or a proprietary protocol.

=== Hosting ISPs ===
Internet hosting services provide email, web-hosting, or online storage services. Other services include virtual server, cloud services, or physical server operation.

=== Transit ISPs ===
Tiers 1 and 2 ISP interconnections

Just as their customers pay them for Internet access, ISPs themselves pay upstream ISPs for Internet access. An upstream ISP such as a tier 2 or tier 1 ISP usually has a larger network than the contracting ISP or is able to provide the contracting ISP with access to parts of the Internet the contracting ISP by itself has no access to.

In the simplest case, a single connection is established to an upstream ISP and is used to transmit data to or from areas of the Internet beyond the home network; this mode of interconnection is often cascaded multiple times until reaching a tier 1 carrier. In reality, the situation is often more complex. ISPs with more than one point of presence (PoP) may have separate connections to an upstream ISP at multiple PoPs, or they may be customers of multiple upstream ISPs and may have connections to each one of them at one or more point of presence. Transit ISPs provide large amounts of bandwidth for connecting hosting ISPs and access ISPs.

Border Gateway Protocol is used by routers to connect to other networks, which are identified by their autonomous system number. Tier 2 ISPs depend on Tier 1 ISPs and often have their own networks, but must pay for transit or Internet access to Tier 1 ISPs, but may peer or send transit without paying, to other Tier 2 and/or some Tier 1 ISPs. Tier 3 ISPs do not engage in peering and only purchase transit from Tier 2 and Tier 1 ISPs, and often specialize in offering Internet service to end customers such as businesses and individuals. Some organizations act as their own ISPs and purchase transit directly from a Tier 1 ISP. Transit ISPs may use OTN (Optical transport network) or SDH/SONET (Synchronous Digital Hierarchy/Synchronous Optical Networking) with a DWDM (Dense wavelength-division multiplexing) system for transmitting data through optical fiber over long distances such as across a city or between cities. For transmissions in a metro area such as a city and for large customers such as data centers, special pluggable modules in routers, conforming to standards such as CFP, QSFP-DD, OSFP, 400ZR or OpenZR+ may be used alongside DWDM and many vendors have proprietary offerings. Long-haul networks transport data across longer distances than metro networks, such as through submarine cables, or connecting several metropolitan networks and can use DWDM equipment on both ends. Optical line systems and packet optical transport systems can also be used for data transmission in metro areas, long haul connections and data center interconnect. Ultra long haul transmission transports data over distances of over 1500 kilometers. ISPs connect to each other and to customers via data centers hosting meet-me rooms.

=== Virtual ISPs ===
A virtual ISP (VISP) is an operation that allows the VISP's customers to access the Internet using services and infrastructure owned and operated by another ISP. VISPs resemble mobile virtual network operators and competitive local exchange carriers for voice communications.

=== Free ISPs ===
Free ISPs are Internet service providers that provide service free of charge. Many free ISPs display advertisements while the user is connected; Like commercial television, in a sense, they are selling the user's attention to the advertiser. Other free ISPs, sometimes called freenets, are run on a nonprofit basis, usually with volunteer staff.

=== Wireless ISP ===
A wireless Internet service provider (WISP) is an Internet service provider with a network based on wireless networking. Technology may include commonplace Wi-Fi wireless mesh networking, or proprietary equipment designed to operate over open 900 MHz, 2.4 GHz, 4.9, 5.2, 5.4, 5.7, and 5.8 GHz bands or licensed frequencies such as 2.5 GHz (EBS/BRS), 3.65 GHz (NN) and in the UHF band (including the MMDS frequency band) and LMDS.

=== ISPs in rural regions ===
It is hypothesized that the vast divide between broadband connection in rural and urban areas is partially caused by a lack of competition between ISPs in rural areas, where there exists a market typically controlled by just one provider. A lack of competition problematically causes subscription rates to rise disproportionately with the quality of service in rural areas, causing broadband connection to be unaffordable for some, even when the infrastructure supports service in a given area.

In contrast, consumers in urban areas typically benefit from lower rates and higher quality of broadband services, not only due to more advanced infrastructure but also the healthy economic competition caused by having several ISPs in a given area. How the difference in competition levels has potentially negatively affected the innovation and development of infrastructure in specific rural areas remains a question. The exploration and answers developed to the question could provide guidance for possible interventions and solutions meant to remedy the digital divide between rural and urban connectivity.

=== Satellite Internet services ===
Satellite Internet service providers deliver Internet access via communication satellites rather than terrestrial cables or towers, making them a common option for rural and remote areas that lack fiber, cable, or DSL infrastructure. Earlier consumer satellite ISPs, such as Hughesnet and Viasat, relied on geostationary satellites, which offer wide coverage but suffer from high latency due to the distance signals must travel.

Since the late 2010s, providers have increasingly deployed large constellations of satellites in low Earth orbit (LEO), which reduce latency and increase available bandwidth compared to geostationary systems. Starlink, operated by SpaceX, is the largest such provider; as of the second quarter of 2026, it operated roughly 10,000 satellites and reported approximately 12 million subscribers across more than 160 countries and territories, according to SpaceX's regulatory filings.

Other companies operating or developing LEO satellite Internet constellations include Amazon, whose service, rebranded Amazon Leo (formerly Project Kuiper), began limited commercial and enterprise service in 2026 after launching several hundred satellites, and Eutelsat OneWeb, which focuses primarily on enterprise, maritime, and government customers rather than residential subscribers. Older geostationary providers such as Viasat have seen declining residential subscriber counts as LEO alternatives have expanded, prompting a shift toward wholesale, government, and enterprise contracts.

== Altnets ==
Altnets (portmanteau of "alternative network provider") are localized broadband networks, typically formed as an alternative to monopolistic Internet service providers within a region.

== Peering ==
ISPs may engage in peering, where multiple ISPs interconnect at peering points or Internet exchange points (IXPs), allowing routing of data between each network, without charging one another for the data transmitted—data that would otherwise have passed through a third upstream ISP, incurring charges from the upstream ISP. ISPs requiring no upstream and having only customers or peers are called Tier 1 ISPs.

Network hardware, software and specifications, as well as the expertise of network management personnel, are important in ensuring that data follows the most efficient route, and upstream connections work reliably. A tradeoff between cost and efficiency is possible.

Tier 1 ISPs are also interconnected with a mesh network topology. Internet Exchange Points (IXPs) are public locations where several networks are connected to each other. Public peering is done at IXPs, while private peering can be done with direct links between networks. IXPs or peering exchanges may be located in data centers.

== Law enforcement and intelligence assistance ==
Internet service providers in many countries are legally required (e.g., via Communications Assistance for Law Enforcement Act (CALEA) in the U.S.) to allow law enforcement agencies to monitor some or all of the information transmitted by the ISP, or even store the browsing history of users to allow government access if needed (e.g. via the Investigatory Powers Act 2016 in the United Kingdom). Furthermore, in some countries ISPs are subject to monitoring by intelligence agencies. In the U.S., a controversial National Security Agency program known as PRISM provides for broad monitoring of Internet users traffic and has raised concerns about potential violation of the privacy protections in the Fourth Amendment to the United States Constitution. Modern ISPs integrate a wide array of surveillance and packet sniffing equipment into their networks, which then feeds the data to law-enforcement/intelligence networks (such as DCSNet in the United States, or SORM in Russia) allowing monitoring of Internet traffic in real time.

== See also ==
- Content delivery network
- Geo-blocking
- Index of Internet-related articles
- Internet backbone
- Internet hosting service
- Network service provider
- Mobile network operator
- Online service provider law
- Open-access network
- Outline of the Internet
