= List of open-source routing platforms =

Open-source routing platforms may refer to:

- Conventional routing daemons
  - Babel
  - B.A.T.M.A.N.
  - BIRD
  - OpenBGPD
  - OpenOSPFD
  - Quagga
  - XORP
  - Zebra
  - Optimized Link State Routing Protocol
  - FRRouting
  - GoBGP
- Software distributions
  - IPFire
  - OPNsense
  - pfSense
  - Vyatta
  - VyOS
  - Carrier Grade Linux
  - Cumulus Linux
- Other protocols and software
