= FRRouting =

Network routing software suite

- Release: April 3, 2017; 9 years ago
- Stable release: 10.7.0 / July 1, 2026; 37 days ago
- Written in: C, Python
- Operating system: Linux, OpenBSD, FreeBSD, NetBSD
- Predecessor: Quagga
- License: GNU GPLv2
- Website: frrouting.org
- Repository: github.com/FRRouting/frr

Free Range Routing or FRRouting or FRR is a network routing software suite running on Unix-like platforms, particularly Linux, Solaris, OpenBSD, FreeBSD and NetBSD. It was created as a fork from Quagga, which itself was a fork of GNU Zebra. FRRouting is distributed under the terms of the GNU General Public License v2 (GPL2).

== Supported protocols ==
FRR provides implementations of the following protocols:

- Open Shortest Path First (OSPF)
- Routing Information Protocol (RIP)
- Border Gateway Protocol (BGP)
- IS-IS
- Label Distribution Protocol (LDP)
- Protocol Independent Multicast (PIM)
- Babel
- Bidirectional Forwarding Detection (BFD)
- Ethernet VPN (EVPN)

It also provides alpha implementations of:

- Next Hop Resolution Protocol (NHRP)
- Enhanced Interior Gateway Routing Protocol (EIGRP)

== History ==
FRRouting broke away from the free routing software Quagga. Several Quagga contributors, including Cumulus Networks, 6WIND, and BigSwitch Networks, citing frustration about the pace of development, decided to fork the software and form their own community.

== See also ==
- BIRD
- OpenOSPFD
- OpenBGPD
- GNU Zebra
