= BIRD Internet Routing Daemon =

Routing software

- Release: June 9, 2000; 26 years ago
- Stable release: 3.2.1 / April 2, 2026
- Operating system: Unix-like
- Type: Routing
- License: GNU General Public License
- Website: bird.nic.cz
- Repository: gitlab.labs.nic.cz/labs/bird

BIRD (recursive acronym for BIRD Internet Routing Daemon) is a multithreaded open-source routing daemon for managing Internet Protocol routing information on Unix-like operating systems. It was developed as a school project at the Faculty of Mathematics and Physics, Charles University, Prague, and is distributed under the GNU General Public License.

BIRD supports both Internet Protocol version 6 and version 4 in the same daemon. It establishes multiple routing tables, and uses BGP, RIP, OSPF and Babel routing protocols, as well as statically defined routes. Its design differs significantly from GNU Zebra, Quagga and FRRouting. BIRD has been included in many Linux distributions for long time, such as Debian, Ubuntu and Fedora.

BIRD is used in several Internet exchanges, such as the London Internet Exchange (LINX), LONAP, DE-CIX and MSK-IX as a route server, where it replaced Quagga because of its scalability issues. According to the 2012 Euro-IX survey, BIRD is the most used route server amongst European Internet exchanges.

In 2010, CZ.NIC, the current sponsor of BIRD development, received the LINX Conspicuous Contribution Award for contribution of BIRD to the advancement in route server technology.

== Design ==
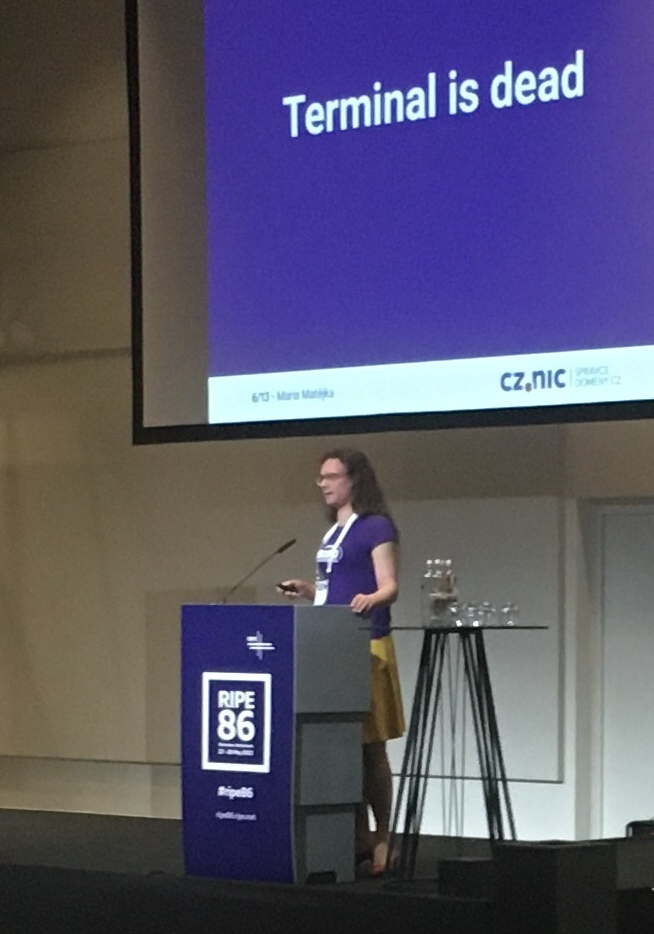
Maria Matějka presenting BIRD v2 design decisions at RIPE#86

BIRD implements multiple internal routing tables of various types to which the supported protocols connect. Most of these protocols import network routes to these internal routing tables and also export network routes from these internal routing tables to the given protocol. This way information about network routes is exchanged among different routing protocols.

Using the kernel protocol this internal routing table may be connected to the actual kernel routing table. This allows BIRD to export network routes from its internal routing table to the kernel routing table and optionally also learn about network routes from the kernel routing table (created externally by the administrator or by other means) and import these routes into its internal routing table.

Filters may be used to control what network routes are imported into the internal routing table or exported to the given protocol. Network routes may be accepted, rejected or modified using filters.

BIRD also supports multiple internal routing tables of the same type and multiple instances of supported protocol types. Protocols may be connected to different internal routing tables, these internal routing tables may exchange information about network routes they contain (controlled by filters) and each of these internal routing tables may be connected to a different kernel routing table thus allowing for policy routing.

Configuration is done by editing the configuration file and telling BIRD to reconfigure itself. BIRD changes to the new configuration without the need to restart the daemon itself and restarts reconfigured protocols only if necessary. There is also an option to do a soft reconfiguration, which doesn't restart protocols but may leave some stale information such as changed filters not filtering out already exported network routes.

== See also ==
- List of open source routing platforms
