= Redistribution =

Redistribution may refer to:

== Economics ==
- Redistribution (cultural anthropology) in relation to non-market economic exchange
- Redistribution of income and wealth
- Redistributive change, theory of economic justice in U.S. law

== Government and politics ==
- Redistribution (Australia), the legal process in Australia whereby electoral boundaries are moved
- Redistribution (election), the changing of political borders
- Redistricting, the redistribution of political borders in the United States

== Science and computing ==
- Redistribution (chemistry), a chemical reaction involving ligand exchange
- Freely redistributable software
- Route redistribution transfers routes between routing protocols
