= LSP =

LSP may refer to:

== Governance and politics ==
- Liberal State Party, a former Dutch political party
- Local strategic partnership, a government-inspired body intended to get local government and other bodies operating in its area working together
- Louisiana State Penitentiary
- Louisiana State Police
- Socialist Party of Latvia, a Latvian political party

== Science and technology ==
- Landing Ship, Personnel, World War 2 type ship
- Language for specific purposes, description of a linguistics field
- Laser shock peening, a surface engineering process used to impart beneficial residual stresses in materials
- Lightest Supersymmetric Particle, generic name given to the lightest of the additional hypothetical particles found in supersymmetric models
- Line spectral pairs (or line spectrum pairs), a kind of digital representation of a filter, used in speech and sound compression
- Linguistic Society of the Philippines
- Localized surface plasmon, a type of surface plasmon excitation in nanoparticles
- Lysergic acid 3-pentyl amide, a psychedelic analogue of LSD with slightly lower binding affinity.

=== Computing ===
- Label-switched path, path through an MPLS network
- Language Server Protocol, a JSON protocol for sending requests to language tools to aid a text editor, e.g., for code refactoring
- Language Service Provider, an entity offering services related to languages
- Layered Service Provider, a part of the protocol stack on the Microsoft Windows operating systems
- Link state packet, packet of information generated by a network router
- Liskov substitution principle, object-oriented programming principle
- Logical Standby Process, a system in Oracle Data Guard data-replication

=== Space ===
- Launch Services Program, a NASA program that organizes the launch of spacecraft
- Launch service provider, a company which launches spacecraft

== Other uses ==
- The Last Shadow Puppets, a British musical project by Alex Turner, Miles Kane and James Ford
- Lee Shu Pui Hall, the largest student-hostel in Chung Chi College at the Chinese University of Hong Kong
- Lego Serious Play, consultant service
- Logistics service provider, outsourcing of logistics services to a third party or 3PL
- London School of Philosophy, adult education college in London
- Lumpy Space Princess, a character on the 2010 animated series Adventure Time
- Josefa Camejo International Airport IATA code
- Lesbian Space Princess, 2025 Australian adult animated science fiction comedy film
