= Non-broadcast multiple-access network =

Type of computer network

A non-broadcast multiple access network (NBMA) is a computer network to which multiple hosts are attached, but data is transmitted only directly from one computer to another single host over a virtual circuit or across a switched fabric.

== Examples of non-broadcast technologies ==
- Asynchronous Transfer Mode (ATM)
- Frame Relay
- X.25
- home power line networking
- WireGuard

== Replication broadcasts ==
Some NBMA network devices support multicast and broadcast traffic replication (pseudo-broadcasts). This is done by send multiple copies of a broadcast packet, one through virtual circuit, so that the broadcast gets to all intended recipients.

== Power-line networks ==
The ITU-T G.hn standard provides a specification for creating a high-speed (up to 1 Gigabit/s) local area network using existing home power lines, phone lines and coaxial cables.

Because of multipath propagation, power lines use frequency-selective channels. Channel frequency response is different for each pair of transmitter and receiver, so modulation parameters are unique for each transmitter and receiver pair. Since each pair of devices uses a different modulation scheme for communication, other devices may not be able to demodulate the information sent between them.

== Split horizon route advertisement ==
In NBMA networks a special technique called split horizon route advertisement must be disabled by distance-vector routing protocols in order to route traffic in a hub and spoke topology. The reason being is that split horizon dictates that a router cannot send a routing table update out of the same interface from which it received it. Thus eliminating the proper propagation from one location to another. This family of protocols relies on link layer broadcasting for route advertisement propagation, so when this feature is absent, it has to be emulated with a series of unicast transmissions, which may result in a receiver node sending a route advertisement back to the node it has just received it from.

== See also ==
- Open Shortest Path First
- Routing protocol
