= Bidirectional Forwarding Detection =

Fault detection protocol

Bidirectional Forwarding Detection (BFD) is a network protocol that is used to detect faults between two routers or switches connected by a link. It provides low-overhead detection of faults even on physical media that doesn't support failure detection of any kind, such as Ethernet, virtual circuits, tunnels and MPLS label-switched paths.

BFD establishes a session between two endpoints over a particular link. If more than one link exists between two systems, multiple BFD sessions may be established to monitor each one of them. The session is established with a three-way handshake, and is torn down the same way. Authentication may be enabled on the session. A choice of simple password, MD5 or SHA1 authentication is available.

BFD does not have a discovery mechanism; sessions must be explicitly configured between endpoints. BFD may be used on many different underlying transport mechanisms and layers, and operates independently of all of these. Therefore, it needs to be encapsulated by whatever transport it uses. For example, monitoring MPLS LSPs involves piggybacking session establishment on LSP-Ping packets. Protocols that support some form of adjacency setup, such as OSPF, IS-IS, BGP or RIP may also be used to bootstrap a BFD session. These protocols may then use BFD to receive faster notification of failing links than would normally be possible using the protocol's own keepalive mechanism.

A session may operate in one of two modes: asynchronous mode and demand mode. In asynchronous mode, both endpoints periodically send Hello packets to each other. If a number of those packets are not received, the session is considered down.

In demand mode, no Hello packets are exchanged after the session is established; it is assumed that the endpoints have another way to verify connectivity to each other, perhaps on the underlying physical layer. However, either host may still send Hello packets if needed.

Regardless of which mode is in use, either endpoint may also initiate an Echo function. When this function is active, a stream of Echo packets is sent, and the other endpoint then sends these back to the sender via its forwarding plane. This is used to test the forwarding path on the remote system.

== Standardization ==
In June 2011 the BFD protocol standardization process entered the Proposed Standard stage. RFC 5880 defines the BFD protocol, detecting MPLS LSP failure, using BFD to monitor connectivity across multiple network hops, and using BFD for IPv4 and IPv6. BFD's operation in conjunction with Open Shortest Path First (OSPF) and IS-IS protocols has also been outlined in RFC 5881..
