= GNU Zebra =

Network routing software suite

- Final release: 0.95a / September 8, 2005
- Successor: Quagga
- Type: Routing
- License: GNU General Public License
- Website: www.gnu.org/software/zebra/

Zebra is a discontinued routing software package that provides TCP/IP based routing services with routing protocols support such as RIP, OSPF and BGP. Zebra also supports BGP Route Reflector and Route Server behavior. In addition to IPv4 routing protocols, Zebra also supports IPv6 routing protocols.

Zebra provided a high quality, multi server routing engine. Zebra has an interactive user interface for each routing protocol and supports common client commands. Due to this design, new protocol daemons can be easily added. Zebra library can also be used as a program's client user interface.

Zebra is distributed under the GNU General Public License.

== History ==
The idea for Zebra originally came from Kunihiro Ishiguro, after he realized the need for quality routing software. While working at an ISP joint venture between British Telecom and Marubeni, Ishiguro encountered venture capitalist Yoshinari Yoshikawa.

Yoshinari Yoshikawa shared Ishiguro's vision for a new routing engine and they combined resources to create the world's first routing engine software. The resulting entity, known as the Zebra Project, was started in 1996.

Ishiguro and Yoshikawa led the IP Infusion company and market a commercial version of Zebra, known as "ZebOS". This ZebOS is being used in networking products, such as FortiOS and the Citrix NetScaler.

The official website announced that "Zebra has been decommissioned".

Since its last release (version 0.95) in 2005-09-08, development of Zebra stopped. A new project emerged as the unofficial successor of Zebra: Quagga.

== See also ==
- List of open source routing platforms
