= VyOS =

Linux distribution

- Developer: The VyOS Project Community
- OS family: Linux (Unix-like)
- Working state: Current
- Source model: Open source
- Initial release: 22 December 2013; 12 years ago
- Latest release: 1.4.4 / 19 December 2025; 8 months ago
- Repository: github.com/vyos/vyos-build
- Marketing target: Enterprise software
- Available in: English
- Supported platforms: amd64
- Kernel type: Monolithic (Linux)
- License: Free software licenses (mainly GPL)
- Official website: vyos.io

VyOS is an open source network operating system Linux distribution based on Debian.

VyOS is used for routing, firewall, VPN, and related network functions, and can be deployed on standard amd64 hardware as well as in virtualized and cloud environments.

VyOS also offers subscription-based support and access to pre-built images for cloud, virtual, and long-term support releases.

== History ==
After Brocade Communications stopped development of Vyatta in 2013, a group of enthusiasts created an open-source fork called VyOS, based on the last community edition, Vyatta Core 6.6R1.

They founded Sentrium S.L, a Spanish company dedicated to providing support and development for the VyOS project. On October 9, 2024, Sentrium S.L. was renamed VyOS Networks Iberia and was acquired by VyOS Networks Corporation, becoming its subsidiary.

== Features ==
- Routing and Protocols: BGP (IPv4 and IPv6), OSPF (v2 and v3), RIP and RIPng, policy-based routing, BGP-LU and enhanced route filtering. IPv4, IPv6, QoS.
- VPN and Tunneling: IPsec, VTI, VXLAN, L2TPv3, L2TP/IPsec and PPTP servers, tunnel interfaces (GRE, IPIP, SIT), OpenVPN in client, server, or site-to-site modes, WireGuard.
- Firewall and NAT: Stateful firewall based on nftables, zone-based firewall, all types of source and destination NAT (one to one, one to many, many to many), NAT64/DNS64.
- Network Services: DHCP and DHCPv6 server and relay, IPv6 RA, DNS forwarding, HTTP load balancer, web proxy, PPPoE access concentrator, NetFlow/sFlow sensor, TFTP server.
- High Availability and Load Balancing: VRRP for IPv4 and IPv6, ability to execute custom health checks and transition scripts; ECMP, stateful load balancing, failover routes.
- Management and Configuration: Junos-style CLI with commands like run, set, delete, show, commit, commit-confirm, compare and versioning. Rollback without reboot, PKI repository
- Automation: ansible, napalm, Netmiko, Salt Stack, cloud-init, python sdk. cloud-init ready images can be built with vyos-build or packer
- Monitoring: integrations with Zabbix, FastNetMon and Prometheus/Grafana.
- Platform and Image Support: VyOS images can be created using vyos-build for the following platforms: amd64, ISO, and cloud images for AWS, Azure, Edgecore, XCP-NG, Qemu/Proxmox, VMware.

== Releases ==
VyOS version 1.0.0 (Hydrogen) was released on December 22, 2013. On October 9, 2014, version 1.1.0 (Helium) was released. All versions released thus far have been based on Debian 6.0 (Squeeze), and are available as 32-bit images and 64-bit images for both physical and virtual machines.

On January 28, 2019, version 1.2.0 (Crux) was released. Version 1.2.0 is based on Debian 8 (Jessie). While versions 1.0 and 1.1 were named after elements, a new naming scheme based on constellations is used from version 1.2.

VyOS 1.3.0 (Equuleus) is based on Debian 10 (Buster) and was released on December 21, 2021. Equuleus brought many long-desired features, most notably an SSTP VPN server, an IPoE server, an OpenConnect VPN server, and a serial console server. It also included reworked support for WWAN interfaces, support for GENEVE and MACSec interfaces, VRF, IS-IS routing, preliminary support for MPLS and LDP, among many other features.

== See also ==
- List of router and firewall distributions
