= Vyatta =

Security software company

Vyatta Software Technology
- Type: Subsidiary
- Industry: LAN, wide area network, security appliance, Internet security, network security
- Founded: 2005; 21 years ago
- Products: Router, firewall, VPN, virtual router, virtual firewall, DHCP, network address translation, web caching, network virtualization
- Parent: Ciena
- Website: www.vyatta.com

Vyatta is a software-based virtual router, virtual firewall and VPN product for Internet Protocol networks (IPv4 and IPv6). A free download of Vyatta has been available since March 2006. The system is a specialized Debian-based Linux distribution with networking applications such as Quagga, OpenVPN, and many others. A standardized management console, similar to Juniper JUNOS or Cisco IOS, in addition to a web-based GUI and traditional Linux system commands, provides configuration of the system and applications. In recent versions of Vyatta, the web-based management interface is supplied only in the subscription edition. However, all functionality is available through KVM, serial console or SSH/telnet protocols. The software runs on standard x86-64 servers.

Vyatta is also delivered as a virtual machine file and can provide (vRouter, vFirewall, VPN) functionality for Xen, VMware, KVM, Rackspace, SoftLayer, and Amazon EC2 virtual and cloud computing environments.

Vyatta sells a subscription edition that includes all the functionality of the open source version as well as a graphical user interface, access to Vyatta's RESTful API's, Serial Support, TACACS+, Config Sync, System Image Cloning, software updates, 24x7 phone and email technical support, and training. Certification as a Vyatta Professional is now available. Vyatta also offers professional services and consulting engagements.

The Vyatta system is intended as a replacement for Cisco IOS 1800 through ASR 1000 series Integrated Services Routers (ISR) and ASA 5500 security appliances, with a strong emphasis on the cost and flexibility inherent in an open source, Linux-based system running on commodity x86 hardware or in VMware ESXi, Microsoft Hyper-V, Citrix XenServer, Open Source Xen and KVM virtual environments.

In 2012, Brocade Communications Systems acquired Vyatta. In April 2013, Brocade renamed the product from the Vyatta Subscription Edition (VSE) to the Brocade Vyatta 5400 vRouter. The latest commercial release of the Brocade vRouter is no longer open-source.

In June 2017, Brocade sold Vyatta Software Technology to AT&T Communications.

In September 2021, AT&T supplier Ciena Corporation announced an agreement to acquire the Vyatta talent and assets.

== Vyatta Core ==
The free community Vyatta Core software (VC) was an open source network operating system providing advanced IPv4 and IPv6 routing, stateful firewalling, secure communication through an IPSec based VPN and through the SSL based OpenVPN.

In October 2013, an independent group started a fork of Vyatta Core under the name VyOS.

In March 2018, AT&T released a new open source project based on the proprietary Brocade version of Vyatta under the name DANOS.

=== Release history ===
| Version number | Release date | Status | Branch | Based on | Kernel used | Major changes | Notes |
|---|---|---|---|---|---|---|---|
| 6.6 | May 2013 | Current | Daisy | Pacifica | 3.3.8 | DMVPN, Multicast Routing, SNMPv3 | |
| 6.5 | Oct. 2012 | Current | Pacifica | Oxnard | 3.3 | Support for Hyper-V, policy based routing, Virtual Tunnel Interface (VTI), BGP Multipath support, and IPsec for IPv6, 64-bit support | IPS is removed from Vyatta Core. |
| 6.4 | April 2012 | Historical | Oxnard | Napa | 3.0.23 | reorganizing operational mode commands, better support of VRRP, Global stateful behavior for firewall, Connection Tracking Enhancements, Enhanced Connection Sync Functionality - Support for seamless failover of FTP, SIP and H.323 connections, NAT Enhancements, CLI Enhancements, Upgrade improvements for bare-metal installations (VSE only), Virtualization upgrade improvements (VSE only), VMware vSphere 5 support (VSE only), XenServer 6.0 support (VSE only), expanded GUI with additional tabs – Dashboard and Statistics. (VSE only) | |
| 6.3 | August 2011 | Historical | Napa | Mendocino | 2.6.37 | x.509 for IPsec, improved user management for remote access VPN, OpenVPN sessions restart, OpenVPN server bridging, migration use volatile data apart from config between images, file management commands. | Web GUI is removed from Vyatta Core. First release with experimental 64-bit builds. |
| 6.2 | March 2011 | Historical | Mendocino | Larkspur | 2.6.35 | Build on Debian Squeeze (vs 6.1 based on Lenny), configurable serial console lines, confirmed commits, configuration archive and possibility to view changes, scripting API, IPv6 DNS resolver, OpenVPN enhancements, improved Configuration Management | |
| 6.1 | August 2010 | Historical | Larkspur | Kenwood | 2.6.32 | DHCPv6, stateful firewall failover, LLDP, configuration items (de)activating and commenting, OpenVPN bridging, IPv6 BGP. | |
| 6.0 | April 2010 | Historical | Kenwood | Isla Vista, Jenner | 2.6.31 | IPv6 firewall, IPv6 BGP, OSPFv3, firewall groups, binary installation, p2p traffic control, NetFlow, drivers for serial interfaces removed. | Vyatta Community renamed to Vyatta Core, subscription and community branches merged |
| 5.0.2 | March 2009 | Historical | Isla Vista | Hollywood, Hollister | 2.6.26 | OpenVPN, Ethernet bonding, web proxy, url filtering (Squish), IPS (Snort), dns forwarding, wireless modems, RAID1, basic IPv6 support, serial interfaces full support. | |
| 4.1 | September 2008 | Historical | Hollywood | Glendale | 2.6.24 | BGP MD5 authorization, experimental IPS, ADSL interfaces | Incremental update for 4.0, never released as a separate distro. |
| 4.0 | April 2008 | Historical | Glendale | Eureka | 2.6.23 | New CLI, PPTP and L2TP VPN servers, PPPoE client, DHCP client, WAN load balancing, ECMP (Equal Cost Multipath Routing), user roles. XORP replaced with quagga. | |
| 3.0 | October 2007 | Historical | Dublin | Camarillo | 2.6.20 | IPsec VPN, multilink PPP, BGP enhancements. | |
| 2.2 | September 2007 | Historical | Camarillo | Bakersfield | 2.6.20 | ? | Probably an update set for 2.0. |
| 2.0 | Feb 2007 | Historical | Alameda | 1.1.1 | 2.6.16 | Multiport T1/E1 cards, BGP performance improved, experimental IPv6 and multicast routing. | |
| 1.1 | ? | Historical | ? | | 2.6.16 | ? | The first Debian based release. |
| 1.0 | 24 July 2006 | Historical | ? | | ?? | ? | |
| 0.5 | 6 April 2006 | Historical | ? | | 2.6.12 | ? | |
