= OpenOSPFD =

Open-source implementation of OSPF protocol

- Developer(s): The OpenBSD Project
- Stable release: 5.9 / March 1, 2016; 9 years ago
- Repository: cvsweb.openbsd.org/cgi-bin/cvsweb/src/usr.sbin/ospfd/
- Written in: C
- Operating system: OpenBSD, FreeBSD
- Standard(s): RFC 2328, RFC 3137
- Type: Open Shortest Path First daemon
- License: ISC
- Website: www.openbgpd.org
- As of: August 2016

OpenOSPFD is an ISC licensed implementation of the Open Shortest Path First Protocol. It is a network routing software suite which allows ordinary general purpose computers to be used as routers exchanging routes with other computer systems speaking the OSPF protocol.

OpenOSPFD was developed by Esben Nørby and Claudio Jeker, for the OpenBSD project. It is a companion daemon of OpenBGPD. The software was developed as an alternative to packages such as Quagga, a routing software suite which is licensed under the GPL. OpenOSPFD is developed on OpenBSD, and ports exist for FreeBSD and NetBSD.

== Goals ==
The design goals of OpenOSPF include being secure (non-exploitable), reliable, lean and easy to use. The configuration language is intended to be both powerful and easy enough for most users.
