= Fabric Shortest Path First =

Routing protocol for Fibre Channel networks

Fabric Shortest Path First (FSPF) is a routing protocol used in Fibre Channel computer networks. It calculates the best path between network switches, establishes routes across the fabric and calculates alternate routes in event of a failure or network topology change. FSPF can guarantee in-sequence delivery of frames, even if the routing topology has changed during a failure, by enforcing a 'hold down' time before a new path is activated.

FSPF was created by Brocade Communications Systems in collaboration with Gadzoox, McDATA, Ancor Communications (now QLogic), and Vixel; it was submitted as an American National Standards Institute standard. It was introduced in 2000. The protocol is similar in conception to the Open Shortest Path First used in IP networks. FSPF has been adopted as the industry standard for routing between Fibre Channel switches within a fabric.

A management information base for FSPF was published as RFC 4626.
