= Route server =

Type of server instrumental to network access point operations

A route server is a type of Server that is used in Network engineering. The original role of a route server was to be an easily accessible source of Routing information about a particular network, for other machines as well as for remote network engineers that would need that information to troubleshoot network issues.

Modern implementations have taken on more roles, the most common being Route aggregation. The Border Gateway Protocol normally requires Peers to maintain sessions with every other peer they could potentially send or receive traffic from, but a route server can aggregate these sessions and make them available for several peers.

== Operation at Internet exchange points ==
At an Internet exchange point (IXP), a BGP route server facilitates multilateral peering by distributing routing information among participating networks. Instead of establishing a separate external Border Gateway Protocol (eBGP) session with every other participant, each network can establish a session with the route server. The route server applies routing policies and advertises eligible routes to participating networks, reducing the number of peering sessions that must be configured and maintained.

A route server normally does not forward user traffic between participants. Traffic travels directly between the participating networks using the selected next-hop address. This distinguishes a route server from a conventional transit router, which forwards packets along a network path.
