= Verizon Business =

Division of Verizon Communications

- Type: Division
- Founded: 2006; 20 years ago
- Headquarters: Basking Ridge, New Jersey, United States
- Area served: Worldwide
- Key people: Kyle Malady (CEO)
- Products: Network, Communications, Mobility, Cloud, Machine to Machine, Security
- Parent: Verizon Communications
- Divisions: Verizon Connect
- ASN: 701

Verizon Business (formerly known as Verizon Enterprise Solutions) is a division of Verizon Communications based in Basking Ridge, New Jersey, that provides services and products for Verizon's business and government clients. Formed as Verizon Business in January 2006 and relaunched as Verizon Enterprise Solutions on January 1, 2012, it replaced MCI Inc., whose last president and CEO was Michael Capellas (previously chairman and CEO of Compaq and briefly a president of the modern Hewlett-Packard), as a trade name. Verizon reorganized into three units in January 2019, which included Verizon Business Group.

== Overview ==
Verizon Business was created following Verizon's acquisition of MCI Inc. in January 2006. The division became Verizon Enterprise Solutions on January 1, 2012 and is based in Basking Ridge, New Jersey. Verizon Enterprise Solutions is the division of Verizon Communications that manages Verizon's business and government clients. The division's network and services were available in more than 150 countries and it had employees in 75 countries in 2013.

Verizon Business operated 200 data centers in 22 countries, providing cloud, hosting and Internet colocation services to customers in 2013. It also had partial ownership in 80 submarine cable networks worldwide, including the SEA-ME-WE 4, Trans-Pacific Express, and the Europe India Gateway systems in 2011.

John Stratton led the division from January 2012 until April 2014 when Chris Formant was named president of the unit.

Verizon reorganized into three distinct units starting in January 2019 Verizon Consumer Group, Verizon Business Group, and Verizon Media Group. When this was announced, it was also announced that Tami Erwin, then executive vice president of wireless operations, would lead Verizon Business.

Erwin was replaced in July 2022 by Sowmyanarayan Sampath as CEO of Verizon Business. In March 2023, Kyle Malady replaced Sampath as CEO.

== Products and services ==
Verizon Business provides products both wireless and wireline for enterprise, small business and government.

=== Networks ===
The company provides Private IP services and networks, as well as managed WAN and LAN services, among other networking services. Verizon also operates a global IP network that reaches 150 countries. In January 2012, Verizon began its Private IP Wireless (LTE) service, which combines 4G LTE with Verizon's MPLS IP VPN.

=== Cloud computing and data centers ===
Verizon Business offers cloud and data center services through its 11 cloud-enabled data centers. Six of these are in the United States, including NAP of the Americas, its flagship Internet exchange point and colocation center. Verizon also has approximately 50 regional data centers and has network access points in the United States, Europe and Latin America. Verizon offers colocation and managed services through these data centers.

In August 2011, Verizon purchased CloudSwitch. CloudSwitch's software allowed Verizon to offer clients the ability to use their existing applications with cloud services.

Verizon had a fabric-based cloud infrastructure called Verizon Cloud, which was in beta testing in 2013. Verizon Cloud has two components: Verizon Cloud Compute and Verizon Cloud Storage. Seven data centers support Verizon Cloud as of May 2014.

As of April 2014, the company's Secure Cloud Interconnect (SCI) service allows enterprise customers to connect their private IP to Verizon's cloud services, and other cloud platforms including Equinix and Microsoft.

In December 2016 Verizon agreed to sell its US data centers business to Equinix Inc for 3.6 billion in cash. The deal includes 24 facilities across 15 metropolitan markets.

=== Connected devices ===
Verizon offers machine to machine (M2M) solutions for clients. Verizon established "Innovation Centers" in both Boston and San Francisco to help clients with M2M development.

Examples of Verizon Business M2M offerings include digital signage, smart cities, smart meters, fleet management, and asset tracking.

Verizon acquired Hughes Telematics in June 2012, expanding the division's M2M capabilities, particularly in telematics, which deals with vehicle telecommunications and technology.

After the acquisition, in March 2013, Verizon Enterprise Solutions began offering Networkfleet solutions, a service which tracks and analyzes data about commercial vehicle fleets to help customers optimize routes and manage their fleet vehicles and employees.

=== Security ===
Verizon provides security management services for its cloud and mobility products. These include threat management tools and protection services, monitoring, analytics, incident response, and forensics investigations. It also offers identity and access management in both the United States and Europe. In November 2013, Verizon Enterprise Solutions introduced Managed Certificate Services, which provide a cloud-based means for businesses to secure connections and data between various types of machines and devices.

=== Other products ===
Additional items offered by Verizon Business include wired and wireless voice, FiOS and data and Internet services. Mobility products offered include mobile workforce manager, mobile application management, and mobility pro services.

== See also ==
- Sprint Corporation
- Comcast
- AT&T Corporation
