= QPPB =

Traffic engineering mechanism

The QoS Policy Propagation via BGP (QPPB) is a mechanism that allows propagation of quality of service (QoS) policy and classification by the sending party based on access lists, community lists, and autonomous system paths in the Border Gateway Protocol (BGP), thus helping to classify based on destination instead of source address.

== See also ==
- Computer network
- Traffic engineering (telecommunications)
