= RPSL =

RPSL may refer to:

- Routing Policy Specification Language, a language used by Internet service providers to describe routing policies
- Royal Philatelic Society London, a British philatelic society
