= Looking Glass server =

System for debugging Internet routing

Looking Glass servers (LG servers) are servers on the Internet running one of a variety of publicly available Looking Glass software implementations. They are commonly deployed by autonomous systems (AS) to offer access to their routing infrastructure in order to facilitate debugging network issues. A Looking Glass server is accessed remotely for the purpose of viewing routing information. Essentially, the server acts as a limited, read-only portal to routers of whatever organization is running the LG server.

Typically, Looking Glass servers are run by autonomous systems like Internet service providers (ISPs), Network Service Providers (NSPs), and Internet exchange points (IXPs).

== Implementation ==
Looking glasses are web scripts directly connected to routers' admin interfaces such as telnet and SSH. These scripts are designed to relay textual commands from the web to the router and print back the response. They are often implemented in Perl, PHP, and Python, and are publicly available on GitHub.

=== Security concerns ===
A 2014 paper demonstrated the potential security concerns of Looking Glass servers, noting that even an "attacker with very limited resources can exploit such flaws in operators' networks and gain access to core Internet infrastructure", resulting in anything from traffic disruption to global Border Gateway Protocol (BGP) route injection. This is due in part because looking glass servers are "an often overlooked critical part of an operator infrastructure" because it sits at the intersection of the public internet and "restricted admin consoles". As of 2014, most Looking Glass software was small and old, having last been updated in the early 2000's.

== See also ==
- Autonomous system (Internet)
- Internet backbone
