= Default-free zone =

Network zones not needing default routing rules

In Internet routing, the default-free zone (DFZ) is the collection of all Internet routers that do not require a default route to route a packet to any destination, most commonly at the core of autonomous systems. Conceptually, DFZ routers have a "complete" Border Gateway Protocol table, sometimes referred to as the Internet routing table, global routing table or global BGP table. However, internet routing changes rapidly and the widespread use of route filtering leads to not every router having the same view of all routes. Any routing table created would look different from the perspective of different routers, even if a stable view could be achieved.

== Highly connected autonomous systems and routers ==
The Weekly Routing Reports used by the ISP community come from the Asia-Pacific Network Information Centre (APNIC) router in Tokyo, which is a well-connected router that has as good a view of the Internet as any other single router. For serious routing research, however, routing information will be captured at multiple well-connected sites, including high-traffic ISPs (see the "skitter core") below.

The size of the default-free zone routing table places a minimum hardware requirement on any autonomous system (AS) that wishes to utilize it.

This minimum hardware requirement has grown over time. On May 12, 2014, there were 494,105 routes seen by the APNIC router. These came from 46,795 autonomous systems, of which only 172 were transit-only and 35,787 were stub/origin-only. 6,087 autonomous systems provided some level of transit. By July 2025, this number has increased to around 990 thousand IPv4 routes, and generally surpassed one million in September 2025, although the number of prefixes can vary by many thousands depending on where the router is located, leading to some routers reaching this number earlier or later. Combined with IPv6 routes, the total routing table size has grown to over 1.2 million entries at that time.

== The idea of an "Internet core" ==
The term "default-free zone" is sometimes confused with an "Internet core" or Internet backbone, but there has been no true "core" since before the Border Gateway Protocol (BGP) was introduced. In pre-BGP days, when the Exterior Gateway Protocol (EGP) was the exterior routing protocol, it indeed could be assumed there was a single Internet core.

That concept, however, has been obsolete for a long time. At best, today's definition of the Internet core is statistical, with the "skitter core" being some number of AS with the greatest traffic according to the CAIDA measurements, previously made with its measuring tool called "skitter". The CAIDA measurements are constantly updated.

== Information at Internet exchange points ==
Large Internet Exchange Points (IXP)—in that they typically include full routes as seen by multiple ISPs, as well as customer routes, in their exchange fabric—are good places to assess global Internet routing.

Before the current commercial Internet evolved, the NSFNET, which interconnected five US government funded supercomputer centers, could have been considered the high-speed Internet core. Four IXPs supported NSFNET, but these IXPs evolved into a model where commercial traffic could meet there. While it is slightly difficult to point to a precise endpoint, NSF funding for transmission ceased by 1998.

== Customer, non-ISP participation in the DFZ ==
It is common practice, in a multihomed but stub (i.e., non-transit) autonomous system, for the BGP-speaking router(s) to take "full routes" from the various ISPs to which the AS is multihomed. Especially if there is more than one router connected to the same ISP, a common practice, it will receive more routes than are in the DFZ. This is because when there are two routers connected to a major ISP such as Sprint, France Telecom or Qwest, that provider has a number of customer AS connected to it. The optimal route to those customer AS are important to the ISP itself, but also tells one customer AS which specific router has the best path to the other customer. The "full routes", or properly "full routes plus customer routes", coming to a customer router makes that customer router part of the DFZ, but certainly not part of the "skitter core".

== See also ==
- Multihoming
- IP transit
- Peering
- Route filtering
- 512K Day
