= DFZ =

DFZ may refer to:

- Cosworth DFZ, an engine produced for Formula One racing
- Default-free zone, a collection of systems relating to Internet routing
- Deflazacort, a pharmaceutical drug
