= BGP Monitoring Protocol =

Computer network protocol

The BGP Monitoring Protocol (BMP) is a computer networking protocol for logging actions related to routing decisions by the Border Gateway Protocol. It is specified in RFC 7854 by the IETF.
