= Nedonna Beach, Oregon =

Unincorporated community in the state of Oregon, United States

- Unincorporated community
- Location within Oregon Location within the United States
- Coordinates: 45°38′38″N 123°56′24″W
- Country: United States
- State: Oregon
- County: Tillamook
- Elevation: 16 ft (4.9 m)
- Time zone: UTC-8 (Pacific (PST))
  - Summer (DST): UTC-7 (PDT)
- ZIP code: 97136
- Area codes: 503 and 971
- Coordinates and elevation from Geographic Names Information System

Nedonna Beach is an unincorporated community in Tillamook County, in the U.S. state of Oregon. Nedonna Beach is west of U.S. Route 101 between Rockaway Beach and Nehalem Bay.

== Undersea cables ==
Nedonna Beach serves as the U.S. terminus of many undersea cables including:

- Trans-Pacific Express undersea cables (three separate cables)
- Southern Cross Cable.
- NorthStar owned by Alaska Communications connecting Oregon with Alaska
