= Private IP =

Proprietary VPN implementation

PIP in telecommunications and datacommunications stands for Private Internet Protocol or Private IP. PIP refers to connectivity into a private extranet network which by its design emulates the functioning of the Internet. Specifically, the Internet uses a routing protocol called border gateway protocol (BGP), as do most Multiprotocol Label Switching (MPLS) networks. With this design, there is an ambiguity to the route that a packet can take while traversing the network. Whereas the Internet is a public offering, MPLS PIP networks are private. This lends a known, often used, and comfortable network design model for private implementation.

Private IP removes the need for antiquated Frame Relay networks, and even more antiquated point-to-point networks, with the service provider able to offer a private extranet to its customer at an affordable pricepoint.
