= Stub network =

Type of computer network

A stub network, or pocket network, is a somewhat casual term describing a computer network, or part of an internetwork, with no knowledge of other networks, that will typically send much or all of its non-local traffic out via a single path, with the network aware only of a default route to non-local destinations. As a practical analogy, think of an island which is connected to the rest of the world through a bridge and no other path is available either through air or sea. Continuing this analogy, the island might have more than one physical bridge to the mainland, but the set of bridges still represents only one logical path.

== Character ==
- An enterprise local area network (LAN) that connects to the corporate network by only one router, or multiple default routers connected to the same logical upstream destination.
- A single LAN which never carries packets between multiple routers connected to it. All traffic is to and/or from local hosts. The routers will only route packets into the LAN if it's destined for the LAN, and out from the LAN if it originated on the LAN.
- A person, or workgroup, who is connected to an Internet service provider (ISP), by only one router, is a stub network with respect to the ISP. This stub network is part of the ISP's autonomous system (AS), discussed below.
- For each interface on which no default route (also called the gateway of last resort) has been elected, Open Shortest Path First (OSPF) refers to these subnets as stub networks.
- An OSPF stubby area is one which receives routes from other areas in the OSPF domain but for external routes, which are communicated via a Type 5 Link-state advertisement, the stubby area is only aware of a default route
- An OSPF totally stubby area is one which only has a default route to the rest of the OSPF routing domain. Such an area may have more than one router, but these routers will only know about the default route to the outside.
- A stub autonomous system that is connected to only one other autonomous system, through which it gains access to the Internet. This is also called a stub AS, which characterize the great majority of AS connected to the Internet. as of June 30, 2007, there were 224622 routes seen by the Asia Pacific Network Information Centre (APNIC) router. These came from 25577 autonomous systems, of which only 74 were transit-only and 22272 were stub/origin-only. 3305 autonomous systems provided some level of transit.
- Stub networks are not to be confused with transit networks, as transit networks contain at least two routers. These networks differ from stub networks since they are able to allow information to pass through them (hence the name).
- The stub network is unique in the sense that it contains only one router, that router being the gateway to the network. Stub networks are also capable of implementing multi-homing technology. This technology is focused on setting a single computer to host multiple network connections and IP addresses.
- Stub networks are useful in situations where the OSPF (Open Shortest Path First) protocol needs to map out the topology of the network. Stub networks serve a special purpose in that they are a certain area within the construction of a network where IP addresses are filtered out and replaced with default routes.
- The experimental evaluation of stub networks has pushed for the use of ad hoc networks to act as stubs for larger multi-service networks. These networks are connected to a larger infrastructure in order to deliver a range of services including security, deliverance of unicast and multicast services, and many others to improve the functionality of these ad hoc networks.

== See also ==
- Multihoming
- IP transit
- Peering
- OSPF
- EIGRP
