= TPE (cable system) =

Submarine telecommunications cable

Trans-Pacific Express (TPE)
- Cable type: Fibre-optic
- Area served: East Asia, United States

TPE or Trans-Pacific Express is a submarine telecommunications cable linking China, South Korea, Taiwan, Japan, and the United States. The line is a US$500 million joint venture between 6 telecommunication companies China Telecom, China Netcom, China Unicom, Chunghwa Telecom, Korea Telecom, and Verizon Communications (AT&T and NTT joined in March 2008). Ownership of the cable is evenly split between the 6 participants. Construction of this 11,000 miles (approx. 17,700 km) line was completed in September 2008, and the Japan branch was completed in January 2010.

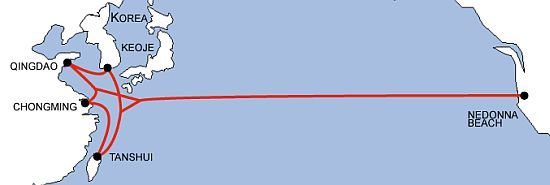
Map showing the cable Layout of the Trans-Pacific Express

At the time of its construction, 5,547 gigabits per second of capacity was available across the Atlantic Ocean, but only 2,726 gigabits per second existed across the Pacific Ocean. Most links to China had to go through a hub in Japan, and access topped out at 155 Mbit/s. The TPE is more than 60 times the overall capacity of the existing cable directly linking the U.S. and China, and thus its construction was a major enhancement to the cable systems between the two nations. It is the first next-generation undersea optical cable system directly linking the U.S. and China, and was also the first major undersea system to land on the U.S. West Coast in more than seven years. Initially, the Trans-Pacific Express cable was configured to handle traffic at 1.28 terabits per second (Tbit/s), but the system has a design capacity of up to 5.12 Tbit/s. Customers can also book individual connections running at 10 Gbit/s.

== Landing Points ==
The landing points of the cable are located in:

1. Chongming, Shanghai Municipality, China
2. Qingdao, Shandong Province, China
3. Maruyama, Chiba, Japan
4. Geoje, South Gyeongsang Province, South Korea
5. Tamsui, New Taipei City, Taiwan (ROC)
6. Nedonna Beach, Oregon, United States
