= Routing Policy Specification Language =

Domain-specific language used by Internet service providers

The Routing Policy Specification Language (RPSL) is a language commonly used by Internet service providers to describe their routing policies.

The routing policies are stored at various IRR databases including RIPE, RADB and APNIC. ISPs (using automated tools) then generate router configuration files that match their business and technical policies.

A routing policy is published in the IRR in an "aut-num" (ASN) object using "import" and "export" (or the newer "mp-import" and "mp-export") attributes, which each contain the peers where announcements are accepted from and announced to, and the filter specification for this set of peers. A single object may contain many such "import" and "export" attributes to specify many different filters.

RFC 2622 describes RPSL, and replaced RIPE-181.

RFC 2650 provides a reference tutorial to using RPSL in practice.

RFC 4012 adds support for additional protocols including IPv6 through the use of "mp-import" and "mp-export" attributes in addition to the IPv4-only "import" and "export" attributes.

RFC 7909 proposes a mechanism combining IRR objects with RPKI to cryptographically secure the RPSL information within the object. This mechanism is not implemented by any major IRR as of 2026.

== RPSL Tools and Programs ==
- RtConfig - automatically generate router configuration files from RPSL registry entries (This software is part of the IRRToolSet)
- irrPT - Tools for ISPs to collect and use information from Internet Routing Registry (IRR) databases
