= Autonomous system (Internet) =

Internet routing system

An autonomous system (AS) is a collection of connected Internet Protocol (IP) routing prefixes under the control of one or more network operators on behalf of a single administrative entity or domain, that presents a common and clearly defined routing policy to the Internet. Each AS is assigned an autonomous system number (ASN), for use in Border Gateway Protocol (BGP) routing.

Originally, the definition required control by a single entity, typically an Internet service provider (ISP) or a very large organization with independent connections to multiple networks, that adhered to a single and clearly defined routing policy. In March 1996, the newer definition came into use because multiple organizations can run BGP using private ASNs to an ISP that connects all those organizations to the Internet. Even though there may be multiple autonomous systems supported by the ISP, the Internet only sees the routing policy of the ISP. That ISP must have an officially registered ASN.

== Autonomous system number ==
An Autonomous system number (ASN) uniquely identifies an autonomous system in Internet routing. ASNs are assigned to local Internet registries (LIRs) and end-user organizations by their respective regional Internet registries (RIRs), which in turn receive blocks of ASNs for reassignment from the Internet Assigned Numbers Authority (IANA). The IANA also maintains a registry of ASNs which are reserved for private use (and should therefore not be announced to the global Internet).

Until 2007, ASNs were defined as 16-bit integers, which allowed for a maximum of 65,536 assignments. Since then, the IANA has begun to also assign 32-bit AS numbers to regional Internet registries. These numbers are written preferably as simple integers, in a notation referred to as "asplain", ranging from 0 to 4,294,967,295 (hexadecimal 0xFFFF FFFF). Or, alternatively, in the form called "asdot+" which looks like x.y, where x and y are 16-bit numbers. Numbers of the form 0.y are exactly the old 16-bit AS numbers. The special 16-bit ASN 23456 ("AS_TRANS") was assigned by IANA as a placeholder for 32-bit ASN values for the case when 32-bit-ASN capable routers ("new BGP speakers") send BGP messages to routers with older BGP software ("old BGP speakers") which do not understand the new 32-bit ASNs.

The first and last ASNs of the original 16-bit integers (0 and 65,535) and the last ASN of the 32-bit numbers (4,294,967,295) are reserved and should not be used by operators; AS0 is used by all five RIRs to invalidate unallocated space. ASNs 64,496 to 64,511 of the original 16-bit range and 65,536 to 65,551 of the 32-bit range are reserved for use in documentation. ASNs 64,512 to 65,534 of the original 16-bit AS range, and 4,200,000,000 to 4,294,967,294 of the 32-bit range are reserved for Private Use.

The number of unique autonomous networks in the routing system of the Internet exceeded 5,000 in 1999, 30,000 in late 2008, 35,000 in mid-2010, 42,000 in late 2012, 54,000 in mid-2016 and 60,000 in early 2018. By December 2020, the number of allocated ASNs exceeded 100,000. As of 2025, there are roughly 120,000 allocated ASNs.

=== Assignment ===
ASNs are assigned in blocks by the Internet Assigned Numbers Authority (IANA) to regional Internet registries (RIRs). The appropriate RIR then assigns ASNs to entities within its designated area from the block assigned by IANA. Entities wishing to receive an ASN must complete the application process of their RIR, LIR or upstream service provider and be approved before being assigned an ASN. Current IANA ASN assignments to RIRs can be found on the IANA website. RIRs, as part of NRO, can revoke AS numbers as part of their Internet governance abilities.

There are other sources for more specific data:

- APNIC: https://ftp.apnic.net/stats/apnic/
- RIPE NCC: https://ftp.ripe.net/ripe/stats/
- AFRINIC: https://ftp.afrinic.net/pub/stats/afrinic/
- ARIN: https://ftp.arin.net/pub/stats/arin/
- LACNIC: https://ftp.lacnic.net/pub/stats/lacnic/

=== ASN table ===
A complete table of available 16-bit and 32-bit ASN:

Number	Bits	Description	Reference
0	16	Reserved for RPKI unallocated space invalidation	RFC 6483, RFC 7607
1–23455	16	Public ASNs	
23456	16	Reserved for AS Pool Transition	RFC 6793
23457–64495	16	Public ASNs	
64496–64511	16	Reserved for use in documentation and sample code	RFC 5398
64512–65534	16	Reserved for private use	RFC 6996
65535	16	Reserved	RFC 7300
65536–65551	32	Reserved for use in documentation and sample code	RFC 5398, RFC 6793
65552–131071	32	Reserved	
131072–4199999999	32	Public 32-bit ASNs	
4200000000–4294967294	32	Reserved for private use	RFC 6996
4294967295	32	Reserved	RFC 7300

== Types ==
Autonomous systems (AS) can be grouped into four categories, depending on their connectivity and operating policy.

1. multihomed: An AS that maintains upstream or peering connections to more than one other AS. This allows the AS to remain connected to the Internet in the event of a complete failure of one of their connections. However, unlike a transit AS, this type of AS would not allow traffic from one AS to pass through on its way to another AS.
2. stub: An AS that is connected to only one other AS. This may be an apparent waste of an AS number if the network's routing policy is the same as its upstream AS's. However, the stub AS may have peering with other autonomous systems that is not reflected in public route-view servers. Specific examples include private interconnections in the financial and transportation sectors.
3. transit: An AS that acts as an intermediary between at least two ASes is called a transit. Since not all ASes are directly connected with every other AS, a transit AS carries data traffic between one AS to another AS to which it has links. A transit AS can be and typically is multihomed.
4. internet exchange point (IX or IXP): A physical infrastructure through which different networks (autonomous systems), typically Internet service providers (ISPs) and content delivery networks (CDNs), exchange Internet traffic. These are often groups of local ISPs that band together to exchange data by splitting the costs of a local networking hub, avoiding the higher network costs and bandwidth charges of a private interconnect or transit AS. IXP ASNs are usually transparent, meaning they are not visible in the BGP AS path. By having presence at an IXP, ASes shorten the transit path to other participating ASes, thereby reducing network latency and improving round-trip delay.

== AS-SET ==
Autonomous systems can be included in one or more AS-SETs, for example AS-SET of RIPE NCC "AS-12655" has AS1, AS2 and AS3 as its members, but AS1 is also included in other sets in ARIN (AS-INCAPSULA) and APNIC (AS-IMCL). Other AS-SET sources can be RADB, LEVEL3 (tier 1 network now called Lumen Technologies) and also ARIN has the ARIN-NONAUTH source of AS-SETs. AS-SETs are created by network operators in an Internet Routing Registry (IRR), like other route objects, and can be included in other AS-SETs and even form cycles.

AS-SET names usually start with "AS-", but can also have a hierarchical name. For example, the administrator of AS 64500 may create an AS-SET called "AS64500:AS-UPSTREAMS", to avoid conflict with other similarly named AS-SETs. Since early 2023, the RIPE NCC enforces hierarchical AS-SET names for new objects, due to issues with conflicts between different IRR databases and potential malicious use based on the AS-SET name. Other IRR databases have soon followed with the same restriction.

AS-SETs are often used to simplify management of published routing policies using the RPSL. Instead of single ASNs, AS-SETs can be referenced in these attributes, which simplifies management of complex routing policies.

== See also ==
- Administrative distance
- INOC-DBA – a hotline communications system between the network operations centers of major Autonomous Systems
- Internet Routing Registry
- PeeringDB – a freely available web-based database of networks that are interested in peering
- Routing Assets Database (RADB)
