= List of acronyms: R =

This list contains acronyms, initialisms, and pseudo-blends that begin with the letter R.

For the purposes of this list:

- acronym = an abbreviation pronounced as if it were a word, e.g., SARS = severe acute respiratory syndrome, pronounced to rhyme with cars
- initialism = an abbreviation pronounced wholly or partly using the names of its constituent letters, e.g., CD = compact disc, pronounced cee dee
- pseudo-blend = an abbreviation whose extra or omitted letters mean that it cannot stand as a true acronym, initialism, or portmanteau (a word formed by combining two or more words).

(a) = acronym, e.g.: SARS – (a) severe acute respiratory syndrome
(i) = initialism, e.g.: CD – (i) compact disc
(p) = pseudo-blend, e.g.: UNIFEM – (p) United Nations Development Fund for Women
(s) = symbol (none of the above, representing and pronounced as something else; for example: MHz – megahertz)

Some terms are spoken as either acronym or initialism, e.g., VoIP, pronounced both as voyp and V-O-I-P.

(Main list of acronyms)

- R – (i) Reinforcing – Right – (s) Röntgen – (i) Restricted (movie rating)

== R0–9 ==
- R@R-(I) Respond as Receipt
- R0–99 – (i) R-value (insulation)
- R2I – (i) Resistance to Interrogation
- R3P – (i) Rearm, Refuel, and Resupply Point

== RA ==
- Ra – (s) Radium
- RA – (a) Radio Australia
- RA
  - (i) Radio altimeter
  - (s) Rain (METAR Code)
  - (i) Rear Area
  - Reinforced Alert
  - Republican Army
  - (i) Resolution advisory
  - Right Ascension
  - Royal Academy
  - Royal Artillery (UK)
- RAA
  - (a) Royal Automobile Association
  - (i) Rear Assembly Area
- RAAF – (i) Royal Australian Air Force
- Rabobank – (p) Raiffeisen-Boerenleenbank (from the two banks that merged to form the modern company)
- RAC
  - (i) Royal Automobile Club (in the United Kingdom, renamed RAC plc in 2002)
  - Rutgers Athletic Center, an indoor arena at the New Brunswick–Piscataway campus of Rutgers University
- RACK – (a) Risk Aware Consensual Kink (SM phrase)
- Racon – (p) RAdar beaCON
- RADA – (a) Royal Academy of Dramatic Art
- Radar – (p) Radio Detection And Ranging
- RADB
  - (i) Real America Database
  - Resource Assessment Database
  - Reunion Address DataBase
  - Rice Allelopathy Data Base
  - Routing Arbiter Database
- RADb – (i) Routing Assets Data Base
- RadB – (s) Rad51/Dmc1 homologous protein
- RADC – (i) Region Air Defence Commander
- RAE – (i) UK Royal Aircraft Establishment (−1991)
- RAF – (i) Red Army Faction – Royal Air Force
- RAG
  - (a) Raising and Giving
  - Rocket Antitank Grenade
- RAGBRAI – (a) Register's Annual Great Bicycle Ride Across Iowa
- RAM – (a) Random Access Memory – Rolling Airframe Missile – Royal Air Maroc
- Ramark – (p) RAdar MARKer
- RAOC – (i) Rear Area Operation Centre
- RAP
  - (a/i) Radio Access Point
  - Radiological Assistance Program (U.S. Department of Energy)
  - Rear Area Protection
  - Recognised [Operating/Operational] Air Picture
  - Recurring Advance Payment
  - Relational Associative Processor
  - Reliable Acoustic Path
  - Rocket-Assisted Projectile
  - Rule against perpetuities
- RAPIDS – (a) Real-Time Automated Personnel Identification System (US Department of Defense personnel authentication system)
- RARDE – (a) UK Royal Armament Research and Development Establishment (1962–1991)
- RARE – (a) Rapid Acquisition with Relaxation Enhancement (MRI technique)
- RASC – (a) Royal Army Service Corp (former corps of British Army)
- RATELO – (p) Radiotelephone Operator

== RB ==
- Rb – (s) Rubidium
- RB – (i) Running back (football)
- R&B – (i) Rhythm and Blues
- RBAR – (i) Row by agonizing row – a derogatory way of describing a technique of scanning a set of records in a database to update or examine the contents of each one. This is the technique of last resort in most cases, since most database operations are optimized when using set based analysis instead of the RBAR method.
- RBCI – (i) Radio Based Combat Identification
- RBI
  - (i) Reserve Bank of India
  - (i) Runs batted In
- RBOC – (a/i) Regional Bell Operating Company ("Baby Bell")

== RC ==
- RC – see entry
- RCA
  - (i) Radio Corporation of America
  - Root Cause Analysis
  - Royal Canadian Artillery
  - Royal City Avenue (famous entertainment zone in Thailand)
- RCAF – (i) Royal Canadian Air Force
- RCAR – (a) Research Council for Automobile Repairs ("are-car")
- RCC – (i) Rescue Co-ordination Centre
- RCCO – (i) Royal Canadian College of Organists
- RCHA – (i) Royal Canadian Horse Artillery (regiment)
- RCMP – (i) Royal Canadian Mounted Police
- RCRA – (a) Resource Conservation and Recovery Act ("reck-ra" or "rick-ra")
- RCS
  - (i) Radar Cross-Section
  - Reaction Control System
  - Revision Control System
- RCT
  - (i) Randomized Controlled Trial
  - Robotically Controlled Telescope
  - Rugby club toulonnais (French, "Toulon Rugby Club")
- RCZ – (i) Rear Combat Zone

== RD ==
- R&D – (i) Research & Development
- RD – Radio Disney
- RDA
  - (i) Research, Development, and Acquisition
  - Recommended Daily Allowance (Nutrition)
- RDD – (i) Radiological Dispersion Device
- RDDL – (a/i) Resource Directory Description Language ("riddle")
- RDECOM – (p) (U.S. Army) Research, Development and Engineering Command
- RDM – (i) Remotely Delivered/Deliverable Mine
- RDO
  - (i) Rapid, Decisive Operation(s)
  - Regular Day Off
  - Remote Data Objects
- RDS
  - (i) Amazon Relational Database Service
  - (i) Remote Desktop Services (Microsoft service)
  - (i) Réseau des sports (French, "Sports Network" — Canadian French-language TV channel)
  - (i) Respiratory distress syndrome
  - (i) Royal Dublin Society (see also RDS Arena, a stadium on the grounds often called "the RDS")
- RDT – (i) Remote Digital Terminal
- RDTE or RDT&E – (i) Research, Development, Test, and Evaluation
- RDV – (i) Remote Detection Vehicle

== RE ==
- Re – (s) Rhenium
- RE – (i) Requirements Engineering
- RE – (s) Royal Engineers
- REACH – (p) Registration, Evaluation, Authorisation and Restriction of Chemicals
- REACT – (a) Remote Electronically Activated Control Technology
- REAM – (a) Retired Educators Association of Minnesota
- RECCE – (a) Reconnaissance
- REEF – (a) Reef Environmental Education Foundation
- REM – (i/a) Rapid Eye Movement (sleep phase) – Rosicrucian Egyptian Museum
- REME – (a) Royal Electrical and Mechanical Engineers
- RERC – (i) Rehabilitation Engineering Research Center
- RES – (i) Radiation Exposure Status – (p) Reserve
- RESNA – (a) Rehabilitation Engineering and Assistive Technology Society of North America
- REU – (s) Réunion (ISO 3166 trigram)

== RF ==
- Rf – (s) Rutherfordium
- RF – (i) Radio Frequency – Receptive Field (neurophysiology)
- RFA – (i) Restrictive Fire Area (military) – Royal Field Artillery
- RFC – (i) Request for Comments – Royal Flying Corps (WWI precursor to RAF)
- RFD – (a) Request for Documentation
- RFE – (i) Request for Evaluation
- RFEF – (i) Real Federación Española de Fútbol (Spanish for Royal Spanish Football Federation)
- RFI – (i) Ready For Inspection – Ready For Issue – Request For Information – Radio Frequency Interference
- RFID – (p) Radio Frequency IDentification
- RFL – (i) Rugby Football League
- RFL – (i) Restrictive Fire Line (military)
- RFP – (a) Request for Proposal
- RFQ – (a) Request for Quotation
- RFR – (i) Right of first refusal
- RFT – (a) Request for Tender
- RFU – (i) Rugby Football Union

== RG ==
- Rg – (s) Roentgenium
- RG – (i) Republican Guard
- RGB – (i) Red Green Blue (colour model)
- RGBI – (i) Red Green Blue Intensity (ditto)

== RH ==
- Rh – (s) Rhodium
- RH – (s) Southern Rhodesia (ISO 3166 digram; obsolete 1980)
- RHIC – (i) Relativistic Heavy Ion Collider
- RHLI – (i) Royal Hamilton Light Infantry (Canadian militia regiment)
- RHO – (s) Southern Rhodesia (ISO 3166 trigram; obsolete 1980)
- RHS – (i) Right Hand Side – Redland High School – (a) Royal Horticultural Society – London
- RHU – (i) Replacement Holding Unit
- RHWR – (i) Radar Homing and Warning Receiver ("raw" for short)

== RI ==
- RI – (s) Rex et Imperator, Regina et Imperatrix King-Emperor
- RI – (s) Rhode Island (postal symbol)
- RIAA – (i) Recording Industry Association of America
- RIBA – (a) Royal Institute of British Architects
- RIF
  - (i) Reduction In Force (layoffs)
  - Resistance Index for Frostbite
  - Reading Is Fundamental
- RIFA – (a) Red imported fire ant
- RILA – (a) Retail Industry Leaders Association
- RIM
  - (a) Remote integrated multiplexer, Australian term for a digital loop carrier
  - Research In Motion, former name of the BlackBerry company
  - Revolutionary Internationalist Movement (Maoist organization)
  - Royal Indian Marine, former navy of British colonial India
- RIMVS – (i) Retinal Imaging Machine Vision System
- RINO – (a) Republican In Name Only
- RIP
  - (a/i) Relief In Place
  - (i) requiesca[n]t in pace (Latin for "may he/she/they rest in peace")
- RIS
  - (i) Range Instrumentation System
  - Réseau Info Sports (French, roughly "Sports News Network" — Canadian French-language TV channel)
- RISC – (i) Reduced Instruction Set Computer
- RISD – (p) Rhode Island School of Design ("riz-dee")
- RISTA – (a) Reconnaissance, Intelligence, Surveillance, and Target Acquisition (see also ISTAR)
- RWH – (a) Rain Water Harvesting

== RJ ==
- RJD – (i) Reduced Julian Day

== RK ==
- RKBA – Right to Keep and Bear Arms (Second Amendment to the United States Constitution)
- RKI – (i) Robert Koch Institute, German governmental research institute in Berlin
- RKO – (i) Radio-Keith-Orpheum Pictures

== RL ==
- rL – (i) Rontolitre
- RL – (i) Release Line – Real Life – Ronnalitre
- RLP – (i) Recognised [Operating/Operational] Land Picture
- RLS – (i) Restless Leg Syndrome
- RLY – (p) Rally Point

== RM ==
- RM – see separate disambiguation page
- rm – (s) Raeto-Romansh language (ISO 639-1 code)
- RMA – (i) Return Mailing Authorization – Revolution in Military Affairs – Rachel McAdams
- RMC – (i) Robert Menzies College
- RMC – (ii) Royal Military College (Australia, Canada, UK)
- RMDA – (i) Records Management and Declassification Agency
- RMP – (i) Recognised [Operating/Operational] Maritime Picture
- RMS – (i) Rate-Monotonic Scheduling – Richard M. Stallman – Root-Mean-Square – Royal Mail Ship (e.g. RMS Titanic)

== RN ==
- rn – (s) Rundi language (Kirundi) (ISO 639-1 code)
- Rn – (s) Radon
- RN
  - (a) Radio Netherlands
  - (i) Registered Nurse (US)
  - (i) Royal Navy
  - right now, in text messages, direct messages, and emails
- RNA – (i) RiboNucleic Acid
- RNAD – Royal Naval Armaments Depot (UK)
- RNPS – (i) Radio Network Planning System
- RNZ – (a) Radio New Zealand
- RNZI – (a) Radio New Zealand International

== RO ==
- ro – (s) Romanian language (ISO 639-1 code)
- RO – (i) Range Only – Red Orchestra – (s) Romania (ISO 3166 and FIPS 10-4 country code digram)
- ROA – (a/i) Rate Of Ascent
- ROC – (i/a) Receiver Operating Characteristic (statistics) – Regional Operations Centre – Republic Of China – Roc-A-Fella Records – Regional Organisations of Councils
- ROCV or ROC-V – (i) Recognition Of Combat Vehicles ("rock-vee")
- ROD – (a/i) Rate Of Descent – Record Of Decisions – Report Of Discrepancy
- ROE – (i) Rules Of Engagement
- roh – (s) Raeto-Romansh language (ISO 639-2 code)
- ROH – (i) Ring of Honor
- ROI – (i) Return On Investment, Republic of Ireland.
- ROME – (a) Return On Modeling Effort
- ROFL(MAO) – (i) Rolling On the Floor Laughing (My Ass Off)
- ROFLOL – (i) Rolling On the Floor Laughing Out Loud
- ROK – (a/i) Republic of Korea
- ROL – (s) Romanian leu (ISO 4217 currency code)
- ROM – (a) Read-only memory – Refuel On the Move – Royal Ontario Museum
- ron – (s) Romanian language (ISO 639-2 code)
- RON – (s) Romanian new leu (ISO 4217 currency code)
- ROP – (i) Render Output Pipeline
- ROPE – Research Opportunity and Performance Evidence
- RORO OR ro-ro – (a) Roll-On/Roll-Off (ferry)
- ROS – (i) Reactive Oxygen Species
- ROTC – (i) Reserve Officer Training Corps ("Rawt-Cee")
- ROU – (s) Romania (ISO 3166 trigram)
- ROV – (i) Remotely Operated Vehicle
- ROW – (i) Right Of Way – Rest Of the World
- ROWPU – (a) Reverse Osmosis Water Purification Unit ("roe-pew")
- ROY G BIV – colors of the prism; Red, Orange, Yellow, Green, Blue, Indigo, Violet
- ROZ – (a/i) Restricted Operations Zone

== RP ==
- RP
  - (s) Philippines (FIPS 10-4 country code)
  - (i) Release Point
  - (i) Reporting Party (Law Enforcement)
  - Role-Playing [relationship potential]
- RPA – (i) Regional Plan Association
- RPD – (i) Recognition-Primed Decision-making
- RPF – (i) Rwandan Patriotic Front
- RPG
  - (i) (US-CA) Regional Planning Group
  - Report Program Generator
  - Rocket Projectile Gun
  - Rocket-Propelled Grenade
  - Role-Playing Game
- RPI
  - (i) Rating percentage index, a metric used in the selection of teams for many (U.S.) NCAA college sports tournaments
  - Rensselaer Polytechnic Institute
  - Retail price index, measure of inflation in the UK
- RPL – (i) Reverse Polish Lisp
- rpm – (s) revolutions per minute
- RPM
  - (i) Rebated Precision Magnum, a family of rifle cartridges manufactured by Weatherby
  - Records, Promotion, Music (expansion of the title of a former Canadian music magazine)
  - Red Hat Package Manager
- RPN – (i) reverse Polish notation
- RPO
  - (i) Radiation Protection Officer
  - Regular Production Option
  - Run-pass option, an offensive scheme in American football
- RPR FOM – (i/a) Realtime Platform Reference Federation Object Model ("reaper fomm")
- rps – (s) revolutions per second
- RPV – (i) Remotely Piloted Vehicle

== RQ ==
- RQ – (s) Puerto Rico (FIPS 10-4 territory code)

== RR ==
- R&R – (i) Rest & relaxation
- RRB – (i) Railroad Retirement Board
- RRN – (i) Recurrence rate number
- RRP – (i) Recurrent respiratory papillomatosis
- RRS – (i) Racing Rules of Sailing
- RRSP – (i) Registered retirement savings plan

== RS ==
- RS – (s) Russia (FIPS 10-4 country code)
- R&S – (i) Reconnaissance & surveillance
- R/S – (i) Respectfully submitted
- RSA
  - (i) Regimental support area
  - Republic of South Africa
  - Rivest–Shamir–Adleman encryption
  - (s) South Africa (IOC and FIFA trigram, but not ISO 3166)
- RSD
  - (i) Reflex sympathetic dystrophy
  - (s) Serbian dinar (ISO 4217 currency code)
- RSEQ – (i) Réseau du sport étudiant du Québec (French, "Quebec Student Sports Network")
- RSI – (i) Repetitive strain injury
- RSJ – (i) Rolled steel joist (construction)
- RSN – (i) Real soon now (coined by author Jerry Pournelle)
- RSPB – (i) (UK) Royal Society for the Protection of Birds
- RSPCA – (i) Royal Society for the Prevention of Cruelty to Animals
- RSR – (i) Required supply rate
- RSRE – (i) UK Royal Signals and Radar Establishment (1976–1991)
- RSRI – (i) Red Sands Research Institute
- RSS – (i) Really simple syndication
- RSTA – (i) Reconnaissance, surveillance, and target acquisition
- RSVP – (i) répondez s'il vous plaît (French for "respond if you please")

== RT ==
- RT
  - (i) Real time
  - Radio telephone
  - Respiratory therapist
  - (p) Return to duty
- RTA – (i) Road traffic accident (British)
- RTBF – (i) Radio-Télévision belge de la Communauté française (French, "Belgian Radio-Television of the French-speaking Community")
- RTCA – (i) RTCA, Inc.
- RTÉ – (i) Raidió Teilifís Éireann
- RTF – (i) Rich Text Format
- RTFM – (i) Read the fucking/fine manual
- RTG
  - (i) Radio-isotope thermoelectric generator
  - Rubber tyred gantry crane
- RTGS
  - (a) Royal Thai General System of Transcription
  - Real-time gross settlement
- RTI – (i) Run-time infrastructure (simulation)
- RTL – see entry
- RTLM – Radio Télévision Libre des Mille Collines (French, "Free Radio and Television of the Thousand Hills"), Rwandan radio station notorious for its role in the Rwandan genocide
- RTLS – (a) Return to launch site – period in NASA Space Shuttle ascent profile where, during ascent, shuttle aborts ascent and turns and glides back to landing strip at launch site
- RTPO-RM – (i) Real Time Production Optimization – Reservoir Management
- RTP – (i) Real-time Transport Protocol
- RT-PCR – (i) reverse transcriptase polymerase chain reaction (sometimes real-time polymerase chain reaction). Clarified with "quantitative PCR" ("qPCR") or "reverse transcriptase PCR" where appropriate.
- RTS – see entry
- RTT – (i) Round Trip Timing
- RTV – (i) Rapid Terrain Visualization ACTD – Retro Television Network

== RU ==
- ru – (s) Russian language (ISO 639-1 code)
- Ru – (s) Ruthenium
- RU – (s) Russia (ISO 3166 digram)
- RUB – (s) Russian ruble (ISO 4217 currency code)
- RuBisCO – (p) Ribulose-1,5-bisphosphate carboxylase/oxygenase (enzyme involved in carbon fixation)
- RUC – (i) Royal Ulster Constabulary
- run – (s) Rundi language (Kirundi) (ISO 639-2 code)
- rus – (s) Russian language (ISO 639-2 code)
- RUS – (s) Russia (ISO 3166 trigram)
- RUSI – (p) Royal United Services Institute for Defence Studies

== RV ==
- RV
  - (i) Reconnaissance Vehicle
  - Recreational Vehicle
  - Re-entry Vehicle
  - reciprocation void
- RVD
  - (p) Rijksvoorlichtingsdienst (Dutch, "Government Information Service")
  - (i) Rob Van Dam (American professional wrestler)

== RW ==
- rw – (s) Rwanda language (Kinyarwanda) (ISO 639-1 code)
- RW – (s) Rwanda (ISO 3166 and FIPS 10-4 country code digram)
- RWA – (s) Rwanda (ISO 3166 trigram)
- RWADA – (a) Resident Weighted Average Daily Attendance (New York State term used in public education to indicate the size of a school district, i.e. its number of students)
- RWF – (s) Rwandan franc (ISO 4217 currency code)
- RWR – (i) Radar Warning Receiver
- RWS – (i) Remote Weapon Station

== RX ==
- Rx – (s) Medical prescription (possibly from Latin "recipere", "to take": see entry)
- RX – (s) Receive
