= Rotana =

Rotana may refer to:

- Rotana Group, business group that includes investments in media and music
- Rotana Hotels, international chain of hotels
  - Beach Rotana Abu Dhabi
- Rotana Jet, an airline based in Abu Dhabi.
- Rotana Media Services (RMS) and RMS Outdoor
- Rotana Magazine
- Rotana (radio), chain of Rotana radios stations in the Arab World
- Rotana Records, a music and entertainment company owned by Rotana Group
- Rotana (television), a chain of Rotana pan-Arab general and specialty television channels
- Rotana Tarabzouni, Saudi singer

== See also ==
- Rutana (disambiguation)
