= RFW =

RFW can refer to:

- Renfrewshire (historic), historic county of England, United Kingdom
- Report for the World, journalism initiative launched in 2021
- Request for waiver, type of document in manufacturing
- RFW (company), Australian vehicle manufacturer
- Rio Fashion Week, biannual fashion week held in Rio de Janeiro, Brazil
- Rotary friction welding, type of welding
