= EUH =

EUH may refer to:

- EUH, the ICAO code for Air Horizons, a defunct French airline
- EUH, the Telegraph code for Haining West railway station, Zhejiang, China
