= RDS =

RDS may refer to:

== Broadcasting ==
- Radio Data System, data on FM radio
- Radio Dimensione Suono, an Italian radio station
- Réseau des sports, sports TV in Canada
  - RDS Info, a sports news channel of Réseau des sports
- RDS, South Australia TV station, sister of RTS (TV station)

== Companies and organizations ==
- Retained Duty System, retained firefighter on call, UK
- Royal Dublin Society, philanthropic organisation and club
- Shell plc, as an initialism and stock ticker under former name Royal Dutch Shell

== Computing ==
- Amazon Relational Database Service
- Random dot stereogram, a form of 3D image
- Reliable Datagram Sockets, a computer-networking protocol
- Remote Data Services, part of Microsoft SQL Server
- Remote Desktop Services, Microsoft remote access
- Research Data Services, merged into Australian Research Data Commons
- Romania Data Systems, an ISP

== Science and medicine ==
- Rate-determining step, of a chemical reaction
- Reflectance difference spectroscopy
- Relational developmental systems, in psychology
- Respiratory distress syndrome (disambiguation), a lung disease
- Respondent-driven sampling, in statistics
- Reward deficiency syndrome

== Other ==
- RDS Arena, a stadium in Dublin, Ireland
- Rajolibanda Diversion Scheme, an irrigation project in India
- Retiree Drug Subsidy, in US healthcare
- Reddish South railway station, England
- Soviet atomic bomb project tests RDS-1 etc.
- Red dot sight, non-magnifying aiming device for firearms
- Royal Drawing School advancing the practice of observational drawing, London, UK
