= 0R =

0R (1000 r) or 0-R may refer to:

- Zero-rated supply, items that are not charged a tax on their input supplies
- Zero-risk bias, irrationally valuing complete elimination of a risk, to a reduction in a greater risk
- Zero-rupee note
- Zero reference pulse, an artificially produced pulse in a television receiver
- A zero-ohm electrical resistance

== See also ==
- R0 (disambiguation)
- Or (disambiguation)
- Zero-ohm link
