= RMA =

RMA may refer to:

== Business and technology ==
- Return merchandise authorization, returning goods to the supplier for repair or replacement
- Rogue Music Alliance, American independent record label
- Radio Manufacturers Association, standards and trades association from 1924–1950
- Regionalmedien Austria, Austrian media company
- Reliability, Maintainability, and Availability analysis, in reliability and systems engineering
- Relationship Management Application, a service offered by SWIFT
- Rate-Monotonic Analysis, the qualitative method used to prepare a system for Rate-monotonic scheduling
- U.S. Rubber Manufacturers Association

== Education ==
- Randolph-Macon Academy, a preparatory school in Virginia, United States
- Rubin Museum of Art, a museum in New York City
- Riverside Museum Associates, a non-profit that supports the Riverside Metropolitan Museum, California
- Royal Musical Association, British musicological organization

== Government and law ==
- Resource Management Act 1991, an Act of Parliament in New Zealand
- Respect for Marriage Act, a 2022 United States federal law that protects same-sex and interracial marriages.
- Richmond Metropolitan Authority, an authority in Richmond, Virginia
- Regional Mobility Authority, an independent local government transportation agency in the U.S. state of Texas
- Risk Management Agency, an agency of the United States Department of Agriculture
- Reedley Municipal Airport, a public airport in Reedley, California

== Medicine ==
- Refusal of medical assistance, where a patient or their medical power of attorney refuses treatment or transport to a hospital by emergency medical services.
- Registered medical assistant, in jurisdictions where "medical assistant" is a protected title

== Military ==
- Rocky Mountain Arsenal, near Denver, Colorado
- Royal Marine Artillery, formerly a part of the Royal Marines
- Royal Military Academy (disambiguation), several military institutions
- Reichsmarineamt, the Admiralty of Imperial Germany's navy (historic)
- Revolution in Military Affairs, the recent rapid development of military technology and its corresponding impact on warfare

== Other ==
- Contracted form of Real Madrid CF, a football club in Spain
- MTV Russian Music Awards
- Roma Airport, IATA airport code "RMA"
- Rma, known as Qiang language, a Sino-Tibetan language cluster
