= MRW =

MRW may refer to:

== Businesses ==
- MRW Group Insurance, owner of Charles Woodhull House
- Morrisons, a British supermarket chain (LSE ticker: MRW)

== Digital formats ==
- Minolta MRW, for raw images from Minolta cameras made 2001 to 2004
- Konica Minolta MRW, from 2003 to 2006
- Mount Rainier (packet writing), on optical discs

== Language ==
- Maranao language, spoken in the Philippines (ISO 639:mrw)
- "My reaction when", used in internet memes

== Mathematics ==
- Multifractal random walk, a multifractal system model

== Publications ==
- Magic, Ritual, and Witchcraft, a peer-reviewed academic journal which focuses on magic scholarship
- Materials Recycling World, a former recycling and waste management magazine published by Ascential
- Major Reference Works (Generally used by publishers, e.g. Elsevier)

== Transport ==
- Maximum ramp weight, for ground aircraft manoeuvres
- Lolland Falster Airport, Maribo, Denmark (by IATA code)
- Mars RK, a Ukrainian airline (by ICAO code)
- Meridian Water railway station, Enfield, London, England (by CRS code)

== See also ==
- MR (disambiguation)
- RW (disambiguation)
