= RVO (disambiguation) =

The RVO (Royal Victorian Order) is a dynastic order of knighthood.

RVO may also refer to:

- Reciprocal velocity obstacle, a type of velocity obstacle
- Return value optimization, a C++-specific compiler optimization
- Rvo, Azerbaijan

== See also ==
- ROV (disambiguation)
