= Radon (disambiguation) =

Radon is a chemical element with symbol Rn and atomic number 86.

- Radon mitigation, against dangers of gas in buildings

Radon may also refer to:

- Radon, Orne, a town in France
- Johann Radon, Austrian mathematician
  - Radon transform, in mathematics
  - Radon measure, in mathematics
  - Radon space, a metric space in mathematics
- Rodan, (Radon in Japanese), a fictional monster
- MSBS Radon, Polish assault rifle
- Jaroslav Radoň (born 1986), Czech canoeist
- Radon Labs, video game developer in Germany

== See also ==
- Rn (disambiguation)
- Isotopes of radon
- Raydon, a village and civil parish in Suffolk, England
- Radeon, a line of GPUs by AMD
