= RM2 =

RM2 or variant, may refer to:

- RM2, the postcode for a part of Romford, see RM postcode area
- Valmet RM 2, a class of two-bogie four-axle tram
- Mendoza RM2, a light machine gun from Mexico
- RocketMotorTwo (RM2), a Tier-1b rocket engine for SpaceShipTwo
- RM2, a cancelled space station Russian Research Module
- RM2, a type of railcar in the NZR RM class

== See also ==
- RM (disambiguation)
- RMII
