= WPL =

WPL, or wpl, may refer to:

== In sport ==
- Women's Premier League (cricket), an Indian cricket league
- FA Women's Premier League, an English football league
- Women's Premier League (rugby), an American rugby league

== In businesses and organizations ==
- Winnipeg Public Library, in Winnipeg, Canada
- Waterloo Public Library, in Waterloo, Ontario, Canada
- Wisconsin Power and Light Company, a subsidiary of Alliant Energy
- Wool Products Labeling, an obsolete ID system, replaced with Registered Identification Number

== In politics and government ==
- Women Political Leaders, a grouping of female political leaders at national and supranational level
- Workplace Parking Levy, a local tax on companies providing car parking for employees allowed for in UK law

== In transport ==
- The William Preston Lane Jr. Memorial Bridge, also known as the Chesapeake Bay Bridge, in Maryland, US
- WPL, the IATA code for Powell Lake Water Aerodrome in British Columbia, Canada
- WPL, the National Rail code for Worplesdon railway station in Surrey, UK
