= RFFE =

RFFE may refer to:

- RF Front-End Working Group (RFFE) of the MIPI Alliance
- Escherichia coli (E. coli) rffE strain (rffE), with mutant defective UDP-N-acetylglucosamine 2-epimerase

== See also ==
- RFE (disambiguation)
