= R&S =

R&S may refer to:

- R&S Records, Belgian record label
- Rabén & Sjögren, Swedish book publisher
- Rohde & Schwarz, German electronics company
- Ren & Stimpy, a 1991 cartoon broadcast by Nickelodeon.

== See also ==
- RS (disambiguation)
- RNS (disambiguation)
