= RN =

RN or Rn may refer to:

== Places ==
- Rio Grande do Norte, Brazilian state (ISO 3166-2:BR code RN)
- Province of Rimini, Italy (ISO 3166-2:IT code)
- County Roscommon, Ireland (code)
- Ratnagiri railway station (station code: RN) in Maharashtra, India

== Politics ==
- National Rally (Rassemblement national), a far-right French political party
- Resistencia Nacional, a revolutionary socialist party in El Salvador
- Renovación Nacional or National Renewal (Chile), a liberal conservative party in Chile
- Ruch Narodowy, a Polish far-right political party
- Fuerzas Armadas de la Resistencia Nacional, was the military arm of the National Resistance, a Salvadoran communist organization
- Resistencia Nicaragüense, Nicaraguan Resistance Party, founded by Contra rebels
- The initials of the 37th U.S. president, Richard Nixon (1913-1994, served 1969-1974); his initials were also the title of his book of memoirs, published in 1978 (RN: The Memoirs of Richard Nixon)

== Science and technology ==
- Radon, symbol Rn, a chemical element
- rn (newsreader), a Usenet news client
- Newline, represented as \r\n in certain operating systems
- Real coordinate space of n dimensions, denoted by $\textbf{R}^n$ or $\mathbb{R}^n$
- Round nose, a type of bullet
- Recurrent nova, a class of repeating cataclysmic variable stars

== Other ==
- Abbreviation of "right now"
- Royal Navy, military branch on the seas and air of the United Kingdom, plus other "Royal Navy" armed forces of Commonwealth of Nations such as the Dominion of Canada and the Commonwealth of Australia
- Radio National, Australia
- Registered nurse, a licensed health care provider
- RN: the Memoirs of Richard Nixon, an autobiography of 37th U.S. President Richard M. Nixon. (1913-1994, served 1969-1974), published 1978
- Registered Identification Number, a US FTC code used on clothing labels
- RN, then IATA code of Air Horizons, a former French airline
- RN, then IATA code of Rayani Air, a former Malaysian airline
- Kirundi language (ISO 639-1: RN)

== See also ==
- M (disambiguation)
- NN (disambiguation)
