= RKI =

RKI may refer to:

- ISO 693-3 language code for the Arakanese language
- NIAI RK-I, a two-seat cabin aircraft designed and built in the USSR in 1938
- Rabkrin, the People's Commissariat of Worker-Peasant Inspection in the Soviet Union
- Robert Koch Institute, a German federal government agency and research institute
- Rokot Airport, Mentawai Islands, West Sumatra, by IATA code
