= RWR =

RWR can refer to:

== Organizations ==
- Right Wing Resistance, a neo-Nazi group founded by Kyle Chapman (New Zealand activist)
- Russian War Relief, an American medical and humanitarian aid organization (1941–1945)

== People ==
- Ronald Wilson Reagan, 40th president of the United States
- Richard W. Roberts, a former U.S. District Court judge

== Places and objects ==
- The Royal Winnipeg Rifles, a Canadian infantry regiment

== Sports ==
- Race Walking Record, a monthly athletics magazine
- Rusty Wallace Racing, a NASCAR Nationwide Series race team, owned by NASCAR Cup Series champion Rusty Wallace
- Rick Ware Racing, a motor racing team owned by former NASCAR driver Rick Ware

== Technology and electronics ==
- Running with Rifles, a game created by Modulaatio Games
- Radar warning receiver, an equipment used to detect radio emissions of radar system

== Other uses ==
- Marwari language (ISO 639-3 language code for Marwari (India))
