= RFD =

RFD may refer to:

== Media ==
- RFD (magazine), a publication for rural gays
- RFD-TV, an American television network

== Organizations ==
- RFD, a safety equipment company founded by Reginald Foster Dagnall
- Rally of Democratic Forces, (Regroupement des forces démocratiques), a political party in Mauritania
- Richmond Fire Department, an emergency services provider in California
- RedFlagDeals.com, a Canadian bargain hunting, coupon, and forums website

== Science and technology ==
- Rear flank downdraft, an area of quickly descending air associated with rotating thunderstorms
- Reduced-function devices, in the low-rate wireless personal area networks standard IEEE 802.15.4
- Reference dose, the US EPA's maximum acceptable oral dose of a toxic substance
- Request for Discussion, similar to Request for Comments; For example, see Usenet newsgroup
- Rate of force development, a measurement of force generated over time used in sports science

== Other uses ==
- Chicago Rockford International Airport (IATA code), US
- Railfreight Distribution, also for Total Operations Processing System (TOPS)
- Request for Deviation, related to a request for waiver
- Request for Documentation, related to a business request for tender
- Reserve Force Decoration, an Australian military award
- Rural Free Delivery, the postal service to rural areas of the US

== See also ==
- Mayberry R.F.D., a CBS television sitcom (1968–1971)
