= Reu (disambiguation) =

Reu or REU may refer to:

== Places ==
- Reu, the local name of Retalhuleu, a city in Guatemala
- REU, the ISO 3166-1 alpha-3 country code for Réunion
- REU, The IATA code for Reus Airport in Catalonia, Spain
- Mount Reu, in Antarctica

== People ==
- Reu, a Biblical figure
- Papa Reu, a performer
- Bishweshwar Nath Reu, a historian
- Johann Michael Reu, a theologian

== Other uses ==
- RAM Expansion Unit, the Commodore 1700/1750/1764 series of memory expansion cartridges for Commodore 64/128 home computers
- Plekhanov Russian Economic University, a university in Moscow, Russia
- Research Experiences for Undergraduates, a U.S. National Science Foundation program for students to take part in active research
- Restricted Enforcement Unit, a UK government committee which controls exports of illegal military material from the United Kingdom

== See also ==
- Reus (disambiguation)
