= RDT =

RDT may refer to:

== Digital technology ==
- Real Data Transport protocol
- Reliable Data Transfer, in computer networking
- Remote data transmission, RDT, old term

== Medicine ==
- Rapid diagnostic test

== Organisations ==
- Rangoon Development Trust
- Rosslyn Data Technologies, AIM trading code
- Royal Danish Theatre

== Transport ==
- Radlett railway station (National Rail station code), England
- Richard Toll Airport (IATA code)
