= RCAR =

RCAR may refer to:

- Religious Coalition for Reproductive Choice, an abortion rights organization
- Research Council for Automobile Repairs, an international body of insurance industry financed automotive research centres
- Real Club Astur de Regatas, a yacht club in Spain
