= Ro =

Ro or RO may refer to:

== Businesses and organizations ==
- Ro (company), an American telehealth company
- Royal Ordnance, a British armaments manufacturer
- TAROM, a Romanian airline, IATA airline code RO

== Places ==
- Rø, Denmark
- Ro, Emilia-Romagna, Italy
- Ro, Greece, a small Greek island
- Romania (ISO 3166-1 country code RO)

== Science and technology ==
- .ro, Internet country code top-level domain for Romania
- Ro (antigen)
- Autoantigen Ro, a protein
- Ro (volume), an Egyptian unit of measurement
- Radio occultation, a technique for measuring the properties of an atmosphere
- Reactor operator, a person who controls a nuclear reactor
- Reverse osmosis, a water purification process
- Receive only, a type of teleprinter
- Anti-SSA/Ro autoantibodies (anti–Sjögren's-syndrome-related antigen A autoantibodies)

== Other uses ==
- Ro (kana), a Japanese character
- Ro (name), a given name, nickname and surname
  - Ro (dubious Danish king)
- Ro (pharaoh) or Iry-Hor (fl. c. 3170 BC), Egyptian pharaoh
- Ro (title), a Fijian title of nobility
- Ro (video game), 2008
- Ro language, a constructed language
- Rö Church, in Stockholm County, Sweden
- Lancia Ro, a 4x2 heavy truck built in the 1930s
- Romanian language, ISO 639-1 language code ro
- Range Officer, supervising a shooting range
- Renewables Obligation (United Kingdom), a British order requiring renewable electricity generation

== See also ==
- R0 (disambiguation)
- Roe (disambiguation)
- Rho (disambiguation)
- ROH (disambiguation)
- Row (disambiguation)
- Rowe (disambiguation)
- Roro (disambiguation)
- Roll-on/roll-off, or RORO, cargo ships carrying wheeled cargo
- Assamese rô, a character distinctive to the Assamese alphabet
