= RTV =

RTV may refer to:

== Broadcasters ==
=== Africa ===
- Rhodesia Television, a defunct Zimbabwean broadcasting company
- Radiodiffusion-Télévision Voltaïque, a former name of a Burkinese broadcaster Radio Télévision du Burkina
- Rwanda Television, a Rwandan television channel

=== Asia ===
- RTV (Bangladeshi TV channel), a satellite television channel
- RTV (Indonesian TV network), an Indonesian television network
- Rediffusion Television, a former television station in Hong Kong (later known as Asia Television)

=== Europe ===
- RTV-7, a Dutch television network with programming from the Dutch Caribbean
- RTV NH, a public broadcasting station which focuses on news from North Holland, Netherlands
- RTV Noord, a radio and television public broadcaster in Groningen, Netherlands
- RTV Rijnmond, a public broadcast organization in Rijnmond, Netherlands
- RTV Slovenija, a public broadcaster in Slovenia
- RTV Utrecht, a regional television and radio broadcaster in Utrecht Province of the Netherlands
- Radio Television of Vojvodina, a public broadcaster in Serbia
- San Marino RTV, a public broadcaster in the microstate of San Marino

=== North America ===
- Retro TV, or RTV, a United States television network

=== Oceania ===
- VTV (Australian TV station), which had the proposed callsign of RTV

== Science and technology ==
- Robotic tech vest, a wearable device to ward of robots
- Ritonavir, an antiretroviral drug
- RTV silicone, a type of silicone rubber
- Room-temperature vulcanization, of silicone rubber

== Other ==
- Return to vendor

== See also ==
- RTTV
