= CA Identification Number =

The CA Identification Number, also "CA Number", is a number used to identify a person or a company who deals with textile products in Canada. The textile dealer uses the CA number on products in place of a name and a postal address. The Competition Bureau is responsible for allocating CA numbers.

The use of CA numbers is regulated by the Textile Labelling Act.

== See also ==
- Australian Company Number
- Registered identification number, used in the United States
