= RTT =

RTT may refer to:

== Computing and communications ==
- Real-time text, text transmitted as it is generated
- Régie des Télegraphes et Téléphones, a Belgian telecom company (now Proximus Group)
- Render to Texture, in computer graphics
- Round-trip time, in telecommunications

== Entertainment ==
- Radio and Television of Montenegro (formerly Radio-Televizija Titograd), a public broadcaster
- Real-time tactics, a genre of strategy game
- Télévision Tunisienne 1, a TV channel (formerly RTT 1966–1983)

== Government and military ==
- Race to the Top, a US federal education grant (2010–2013)
- Recapture Tactics Team, a US Marine Corps specialist unit (formed 1987)

== Transport ==
- Realtime Trains, a British rail service tracker (launched 2012)
- River Trade Terminal, an inland port in Hong Kong (founded 1996)

== Other uses ==
- Rett syndrome, a neurological disorder
- Rooftop tent

== See also ==
- 1xRTT, a mobile communications protocol
