= RSA =

RSA may refer to:

== Organizations ==
=== Academia and education ===
- Rabbinical Seminary of America, a yeshiva in New York City
- Regional Science Association International (formerly the Regional Science Association), a US-based learned society
- Renaissance Society of America, a scholarly organization based in New York City
- Rhetoric Society of America, an academic organization for the study of rhetoric
- Royal Scottish Academy, a Scottish institute of the Arts
- Royal Society of Arts, a British charitable organisation, formally the Royal Society for the Encouragement of Arts, Manufactures and Commerce

=== Military ===
- Redstone Arsenal, a United States Army post adjacent to Huntsville, Alabama
- Royal New Zealand Returned and Services' Association, an organization for the welfare of veterans of New Zealand's military
- Royal School of Artillery, a British Army training establishment for artillery warfare
- Royal Serbian Army (1882–1918), army of the Kingdom of Serbia
- Royal Signals Association, an organization for serving and retired members of the Royal Corps of Signals, of the British Army

=== Other organizations ===
- RSA Insurance Group (Royal and Sun Alliance), United Kingdom
- RSA Security, a US network security company
- Rehabilitation Services Administration, a US Department of Education agency
- Retirement Systems of Alabama, US
- Ridley Scott Associates, a UK film company
- Road Safety Authority, Ireland
- Russian Ski Association

== People ==
- Ramon S. Ang, Filipino business executive known by his initials "RSA"

== Places ==
- Republic of South Africa, IOC country code
- Santa Rosa Airport (Argentina), in La Pampa province (IATA code RSA)

== In science and technology ==
=== Biology, organic chemistry, and medicine ===
- Respiratory sinus arrhythmia, the heart rate variation due to respiration
- Retrosynthetic analysis, in organic chemistry
- Rsa RNA, partially characterised non-coding RNA from Staphylococcus aureus
- Root System Architecture

=== Cryptography and security ===
- RSA (cryptosystem) (Rivest–Shamir–Adleman), for public-key encryption
  - RSA Conference, annual gathering
  - RSA Factoring Challenge, for factoring a set of semi-prime numbers
  - RSA numbers, with two prime numbers as factors

=== Other uses in science and technology ===
- RSA (missile), a Swiss-developed surface-to-air missile system
- Rational Software Architect, part of IBM Rational Application Developer
- Remote supervisor adapter, an out-of-band management interface on IBM servers
- Revolver Stechkina-Avraamova, a designation of the Russian OTs-01 Kobalt revolver
- Roentgen stereophotogrammetric analysis, also called radiostereometric analysis, a method of calculating 3D orientation using X-ray images
- The Rational Speech Act framework in the study of pragmatics

== Other uses ==
- Ray Steadman-Allen, a composer of music
- Repressive state apparatuses, a concept in Louis Althusser's philosophy
- Responsible Service of Alcohol, alcohol server training in several Australian states
- Revenu de solidarité active, French benefit for low-paid workers
- New Hampshire Revised Statutes Annotated, an entire body of laws
- Runway safety area, or runway end safety area, for aircraft
