= R0 =

R0 or R00 may refer to:

- .r00, a software file extension
- Brussels Ring, a motorway in Belgium
- Haplogroup R0, formerly known as haplogroup pre-HV
- R_{0}, Basic reproduction number in epidemiology
- R_{0}, Net reproduction rate in population ecology and demography
- Samsung YP-R0, a digital audio player

== See also ==
- RO (disambiguation)
- 0R (disambiguation)
