= RPV =

RPV may mean:

- Rancho Palos Verdes
- Reactor pressure vessel
- Remote-Person View
- Remotely Piloted Vehicle
- Reporter virus particles
- Republican Party of Virginia
- Rilpivirine, a drug against HIV/AIDS
