= RDMS =

RDMS may refer to:

- Relational database management system (RDMS or RDBMS)
- Registered Diagnostic Medical Sonographer, a credential imparted by the American Registry for Diagnostic Medical Sonography

== See also ==
- RDM (disambiguation)
