= RSD =

RSD most often refers to:

- Serbian dinar, ISO 4217 code for the currency of the Republic of Serbia
- Reflex sympathetic dystrophy; see complex regional pain syndrome
- Rejection sensitive dysphoria in psychology

RSD may also refer to:

== Science ==
- Redshift-space distortions in cosmology
- Repetitive stress disorder, another term for repetitive strain injury
- Regulator of sigma D, an anti-sigma factor in E. coli bacteria

== Statistics ==
- Relative standard deviation
- Robust standard deviation

== Technology ==
- Really Simple Discovery, an XML format describing some features of a blog service
- Remote sensing data
- Roller shutter door
- Retinal scanning display, another term for a virtual retinal display
- Recreational Software Designs, the developer of the game creation system Game-Maker

== People ==
- Rahul Sharad Dravid, an Indian former cricketer and commentator
- Alias of Rob Smith (British musician), British electronic musician

== Schools and school districts ==
- Rochester School for the Deaf, a school in Rochester, New York, USA
- Royal School Dungannon, a grammar school in Northern Ireland
- Reading School District in Reading, Pennsylvania
- Recovery School District - Louisiana
- Rhinelander School District in Rhinelander, Wisconsin
- Rochester City School District in Rochester, New York
- Rockwood School District in St. Louis County, Missouri
- Roosevelt School District in Phoenix, Arizona

== Other uses ==
- Record Store Day, an annual celebration of independent record stores
- RSD-Gaskiya, or Social Democratic Rally, a political party of Niger
- Real Social Dynamics, a former US-based company specializing in teaching men how to meet and pick up women, employing Julien Blanc
- Reichssicherheitsdienst (Reich security service), SS bodyguard for Hitler and other high-ranking leaders of the Nazi regime
- Rock Sound International Airport, Bahamas (IATA code: RSD)
- Royalstar, a Chinese home appliance brand, also known as Rongshida or RSD
