= RTF =

RTF may refer to:

== Organizations ==
- Radiodiffusion-Télévision Française, a broadcaster in France, 1949–1964
- Regional Task Force, the military operation of the RCI-LRA, run by the African Union, 2011–2018
- Royal Tyrone Fusiliers, an Irish militia regiment raised in 1793 for home defence and internal security during the French Revolutionary War
- Russian Tennis Federation, the national governing body of tennis in Russia

== Technology ==
- Rich Text Format, a file format for documents
- Ready to Fly (radio control), type of model aircraft

== See also ==
- Return to Flight (disambiguation), one of several NASA space missions
- RTF Inter, former name of France Inter radio station
