= RMS =

RMS may refer to:

== Places ==
- Ramstein Air Base, in Germany (IATA code RMS)
- Republik Maluku Selatan (Republic of the South Moluccas), a self-proclaimed republic in the Maluku Islands, founded in 1950

== Organizations ==
=== Learned societies ===
- Ramanujan Mathematical Society, a learned society founded in 1985 in India
- Royal Medical Society, a learned society founded in 1737 at the University of Edinburgh Medical School
- Royal Meteorological Society, a learned society founded in 1850 in Aylesbury in Buckinghamshire
- Royal Microscopical Society, a learned society founded in 1839 in London, now headquartered in Oxford
- Russian Mineralogical Society, a learned society founded in 1817 in Saint Petersburg
- Russian Musical Society, a learned society founded in 1859 and disbanded in 1917

=== Schools ===
==== United States ====
- Radnor Middle School, in Radnor, Pennsylvania
- Redwood Middle School (Saratoga, California)
- Rice Middle School, in Plano, Texas
- Richardson Middle School, in Chicago, Illinois
- Richland Middle School, in Richland Hills, Texas
- Riverwood Middle School, in Kingwood, Texas
- Robinson Middle School, in Plano, Texas
- Rocky Mountain semester, in Leadville, Colorado; now called High Mountain Institute Semester
- Romulus Middle School, in Romulus, Michigan
- Roosevelt Middle School (Oakland, California)
- Rosemount Middle School, in Rosemount, Minnesota
- Ridgely Middle School, in Lutherville, Maryland

==== Elsewhere ====
- Rambhakta Memorial School in Banepa, Kavre, Nepal
- Reims Management School, in Reims, France
- Robert May's School, in Hampshire, England
- The Royal Masonic School for Girls, in Hertfordshire, England
- Rutland Middle School, in British Columbia, Canada

=== Other organizations ===
- Hermès (Euronext Paris: RMS), a French luxury fashion house
- Railway Mail Service, a former US mail transportation service
- Raytheon Missile Systems, a former company which manufactured missiles
- Regroupement des militants syndicaux ("Trades-Union Militants Grouping"), a political organization in Quebec, Canada, in the 1970s
- Revenue Management Society, a British industry organisation
- Risk Management Solutions, a subsidiary of Moody's Corporation
- RMS, a prefix for Royal Mail Ships and aircraft, UK
- Roads and Maritime Services, a former agency of the New South Wales government, Australia
- Rotana Media Services, the advertising and marketing wing of Rotana Group
- Rotating Memory Systems, Inc., a defunct hard disk drive manufacturer
- Royal Society of Miniature Painters, Sculptors and Gravers, originally the Royal Miniatures Society, London

== Science and technology ==
=== Biology and medicine ===
- Rhabdomyosarcoma, a cancer of connective tissues
- Rostral migratory stream, one path that neuronal stem cells travel along to reach the olfactory bulb
- Relapsing Multiple Sclerosis

=== Computing ===
- Rate-monotonic scheduling, a scheduling technique in operating systems
- Record Management Services, file-management processes in OpenVMS and PDP-11 operating systems
- Record Management System, a persistent storage mechanism available to some Java ME configurations
- Rights Management Services, a component of MS Windows Server 2003

=== Other uses in science and technology ===
- Reconfigurable Manufacturing System, designed for rapid change in its structure
- Remote Manipulator System, a robotic arm on the Space Shuttle
- Residual mean square, a measure of the difference between data and a model of that data
- Revenue Management System (or revenue management software), a software system for managing occupancy in hotels and suchlike
- RMS (noise reduction) (Rauschminderungssystem), a Dolby-B-compatible compander in the former GDR in the 1980s
- Root mean square, a measure of the magnitude of a varying quantity
- Royal Microscopical Society thread, or society thread, a screw thread used for microscope objective lenses
- "Watt RMS", an erroneous term for "average power" used in audio measurements

== Other uses ==
- Resilient Multi-mission Space STaR Shot program, a satellite defence program being developed by Airbus at Lot Fourteen in Adelaide, Australia
- The initials of Richard Matthew Stallman, a software freedom activist and computer programmer
- RMS (band), a British jazz/rock fusion band, formed in 1982
- Royal Mail Ship, the ship prefix used for seagoing vessels that carry mail under contract to the British Royal Mail
