= Rutana (disambiguation) =

Rutana is a town in Burundi.

Rutana may also refer to:

- Rutana Province, a province of Burundi,
- Rutana (languages), a term for non-Arabic languages spoken in Sudan
