= RBAR =

RBAR may refer to:

- Red Bull Air Race
- Resizable Base Address Register, of a PCIe bus; see Radeon RX 5000 series
- Row by agonizing row, a database technique; see List of acronyms: R
