= RRN =

RRN can refer to:

- Relative record number
- Resident registration number
- Retrieval Reference Number, a key to uniquely identify a card transaction based on the ISO 8583 standard
- Route reestablishment notification
- Run River North, an indie folk-rock band from Los Angeles, California
- Rural Reconstruction Nepal, a social development NGO in Nepal
- Real Raw News, an American fake news website
