= Zero-rupee note =

Indian imitation banknote to protest corruption

Zero-rupee note – obverse

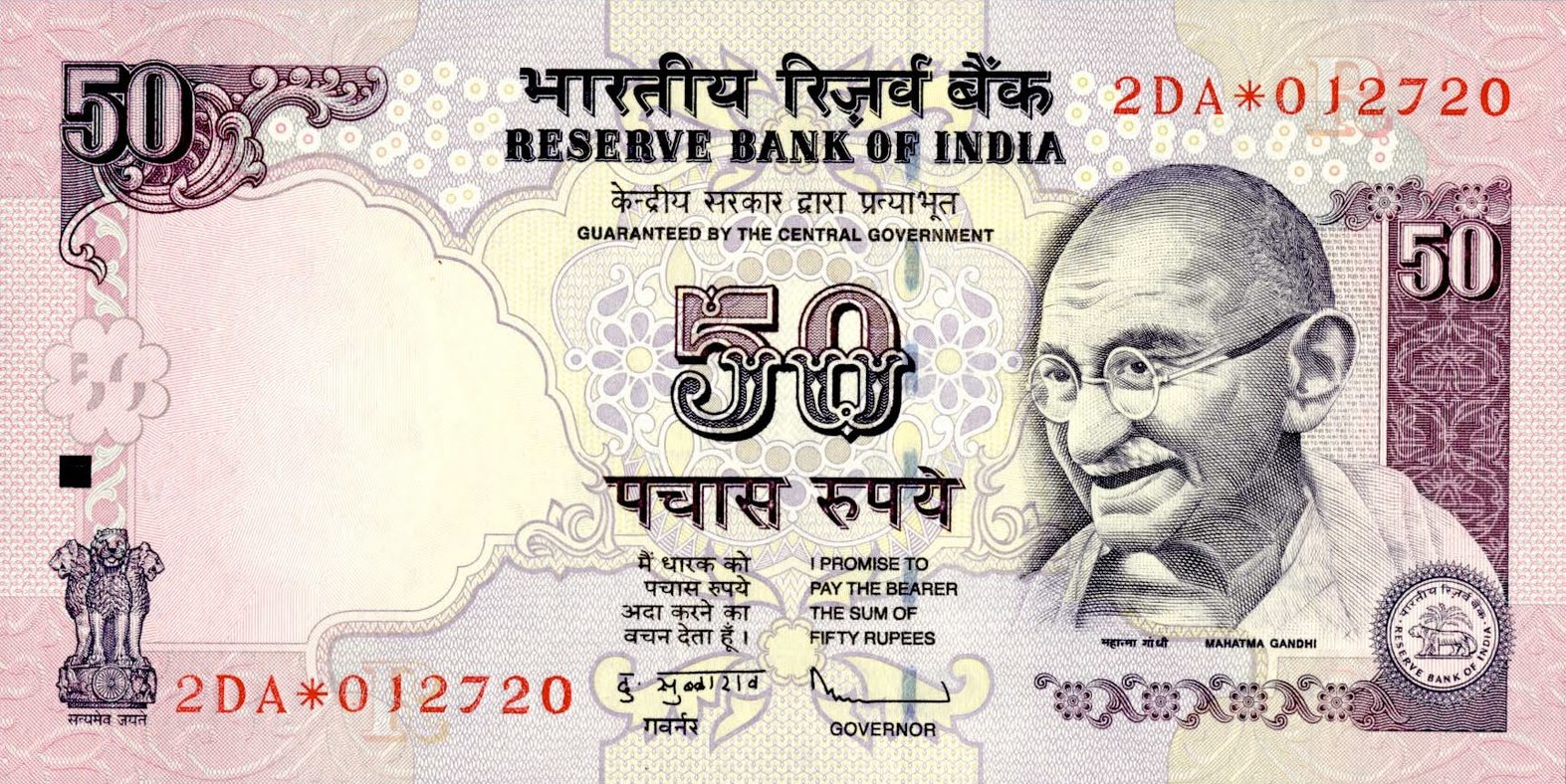
The old 50-rupee banknote of India, serving as a template to the zero-rupee note.

A zero-rupee note is a banknote imitation issued in India as a means of helping to fight systemic political corruption. The notes are "paid" in protest by angry citizens to government functionaries who solicit bribes in return for services which are supposed to be free. Zero-rupee notes, which are made to resemble the old 50-rupee banknote of India, are the creation of a non-governmental organization known as 5th Pillar which has, since their inception in 2007, distributed over 2.5 million notes as of August 2014. The notes remain in current use and thousands of notes are distributed every month.

== History ==
=== Corruption in India ===
Bribery—the offering or solicitation of items of value to influence the actions of a government official—is recognized as a pervasive problem in India, with the 2010 report by anti-corruption watchdog organization Transparency International ranking India in 87th place on its Corruption Perceptions Index. A 2005 study published by Transparency International India indicated that as many of 62% of Indian citizens had first-hand experience of having paid a bribe or used an illicit "contact" to get a government job done.

The 2005 Transparency International India study was the largest study of the Indian bribery problem ever undertaken, with 14,405 respondents from 20 states contributing. The survey focused on petty corruption experienced by common citizens in daily life, rather than upon the large-scale corruption of the rich and powerful.

The 2005 study exposed chronic graft problems, with substantial numbers of survey respondents reporting direct experience in being forced to pay bribes to the police (80%), land administration (48%), and judiciary (47%). Majorities of survey respondents characterized the police, judiciary, land administration, municipal government, electricity supply system, government hospital system, ration card system, water supply system, and system of assessing individual income taxes as corrupt. Fully 45% of survey respondents believed that there was corruption as well in the primary school system.

=== Origin of zero-rupee notes ===
Zero-rupee note – Hindi language reverse

In 2007, a non-profit organization known as 5th Pillar created the zero-rupee note as a means for Indians to register their refusal to participate in bribery. Closely patterned after the nation's fifty-rupee notes, these documents instead included anti-corruption slogans "Eliminate corruption at all levels" and "I promise to neither accept nor give bribe."

These zero-rupee notes were designed for use by Indian citizens who have been requested to pay bribes in order to obtain services that are legally free or who are hit with illicit surcharges on such routine government transactions as obtaining a driver's license. Such currency devices enable the citizen to register their opposition to the illegal request in a tangible form, "paying" the official with these valueless alternative notes.

"The note is a way for any human being to say no to corruption without the fear of facing an encounter with persons in authority", 5th Pillar said in an official statement.

President of 5th Pillar, Vijay Anand, expressed satisfaction with the program's efficacy: "People have already started using them and it is working. One auto rickshaw driver was pulled over by a policeman in the middle of the night who said he could go if he was "taken care of". The driver gave him the note instead. The policeman was shocked but smiled and let him go. The purpose of this is to instill confidence in people to say no to bribery."

In addition to registering the individual's protest, zero-rupee notes provide corrupt officials with a sign that efforts are ongoing to fight systemic government corruption. Use of the notes is intended to shame or scare bureaucrats into honest behavior by reminding these officials that laws against bribery exist.

While the zero-rupee notes appear similar to a genuine Indian fifty-rupee note, they are not issued by the Indian government and are thus not legal tender. Only one side of the note is printed to resemble currency so as not to run afoul of counterfeiting laws.

According to 5th Pillar, Indian citizens pay approximately £3 billion (about $4.9 billion) in bribes each year—a figure considered to be substantially understated by many government insiders.

=== Circulation and legacy ===
Satindar Mohan Bhagat, an Indian expatriate who is a physics professor at the University of Maryland and the director of Association for India's Development, Inc. US, is credited with originating the concept of the zero-rupee note in 2001. Upon returning to India for a visit, Bhagat was frustrated by the petty extortion demands of government officials that were part of daily life and conceived of the idea of a zero-rupee note as a polite way of declining participation. The charity 5th Pillar put Bhagat's idea into practice.

5th Pillar began the campaign in the spring of 2007 with a first printing of 25,000 notes that were distributed in the Indian city of Chennai. Buoyed by the success of the campaign, additional printings followed and use of the zero-rupee note spread across the nation. From their inception through August 2014, 5th Pillar distributed over 2.5 million zero-rupee notes.

Zero-rupee notes have been issued in five of the 22 scheduled languages of India: Tamil, Hindi, Kannada, Malayalam, and Telugu.

This concept for use in the fight against corruption has recently been adopted from 5th Pillar to few other nations suffering from endemic government bribery problems including Yemen, Ghana, Benin, Mexico and Nepal.

As of 2015, 5th Pillar expanded the zero-rupee note concept beyond India to other country currencies, on the website ZeroCurrency.org.

== See also ==
- Jan Lokpal Bill
