= RDO =

RDO may stand for:

- Radom Airport, Poland, IATA code
- Radio Dom Ostankino, Russian broadcaster and member of the European Broadcasting Union
- Ranidel de Ocampo (born 1981), Filipino basketball player
- Raster Document Object (.rdo), a file format used in print on demand systems manufactured by Xerox
- Rate–distortion optimization, a decision algorithm used in video compression
- Remote Data Objects, a deprecated Microsoft technology
- Relational Database Operator, a query interface for the Oracle Rdb database
- Red Hat Distribution of OpenStack, a community-supported distribution of OpenStack launched by Red Hat in 2013
- Red Dead Online, a 2019 video game
- Regular Democratic Organization, a historical political group based in New Orleans, United States
