= Johann Michael Reu =

German-American author

- Born: November 16, 1869; Diebach, Bavaria, Germany.
- Died: October 14, 1943 (aged 73); Dubuque, Iowa
- Education: Neuendettelsau Mission Institute (1887-1889); University of Erlangen-Nuremberg (Th.D. 1910)
- Religion: Lutheranism
- Offices held: Professor, Wartburg Theological Seminary (1899-1943)

Johann Michael Reu (November 16, 1869 – October 14, 1943) was a German - American Lutheran theologian, author and educator.

Johann Michael Reu was born at Diebach, in Bavaria, Germany. He was the youngest of ten children. His father died when Reu was only two years old. Reu studied from 1887 to 1889 at the nearby Neuendettelsau Mission Institute (Neuendettelsauer Missionsgesellschaft) which had been founded by Wilhelm Loehe in 1841.

He was ordained a Lutheran minister at age 20 and emigrated to the United States, where he first served as an assistant pastor in Mendota, Illinois. He subsequently became pastor of Immanuel Lutheran Church in Rock Falls, Illinois. In 1899, he joined the faculty of Wartburg Theological Seminary in Dubuque, Iowa, where he taught until his death in 1943.

In 1902, Reu became an American citizen. Reu was awarded a Doctorate in Theology from the University of Erlangen-Nuremberg in 1910 and also received an honorary Doctorate of Literature from Capital University in Columbus, Ohio, in 1926. He was a prolific author of 66 books, covering nearly all topics in Christian life, as well as more than 3,000 published book reviews.

The archives of Wartburg Theological Seminary contain Reu's papers, correspondence, sermons, and writings.

== Selected bibliography ==
- Christliche ethik in kurzer skizzierung (1914) (translated and published as Christian Ethics in 1934)
- Thirty-five Years of Luther Research (1917)
- How I Tell the Bible Stories to My Sunday School (1918)
- Catechetics: or, Theory and practise of religious instruction (1918)
- Homiletics: A Manual of the Theory and Practice of Preaching (1922)
- The Augsburg Confession: A Collection of Sources with an Historical Introduction (1930)
- The Lutheran Symbols in Particular (1933)
- What is Scripture and How Can We Be Sure of Its Divine Origin (1939)
- An Explanation of Dr. Martin Luther’s Small Catechism (1959)
