= RHLI =

RHLI may refer to:

- Royal Hamilton Light Infantry (Wentworth Regiment)
- Acyl-homoserine-lactone synthase, an enzyme
