= NIAI RK-I =

RK-I

General information
- Type: Telescopic Wing Fighter Aircraft
- National origin: USSR
- Manufacturer: NIAI (Naoochno-Issledovatel'skiy Aero-Institoot - scientific test aero-institute)
- Designer: Grigory Ivanovich Bakshayev
- Number built: 1

The RK-I (Razdvizhnoye Krylo - Istrebitel – extending wing - fighter) (a.k.a. RK-2) was a two-seat cabin aircraft designed and built in the USSR from October 1938.

== Development ==
In 1930 the LIIPS (Leningrad institute for sail and communications engineers) formed a UK GVF (training centre for civil air fleet), in turn the UK GVF formed the NIAI (Naoochno-Issledovatel'skiy Aero-Institoot - scientific test aero-institute) which became the focus of several good design engineers who were given command of individual OKB (Osboye Konstrooktorskoye Byuro – personal design/construction bureau).

Along with contemporary aircraft designers, in Russia and abroad, Grigorii Ivanovich Bakshayev was interested in the concept of variable geometry aircraft, where the size and/or shape of wings are altered according to the stage of flight, or desired characteristics. There are many methods of achieving this but one of the simplest is the telescopic wing, where wing sections of bigger area and, possibly, aerofoil section, are telescoped out over the original wing. Bakshayev designed the RK-I to use a telescopic wing with fifteen sections, of gradually increasing size, extending outwards from the fuselage to the demands of the pilot.

The RK-I fuselage was of light-alloy semi-monocoque construction with a conventional tail unit. The retractable tail-wheel undercarriage was attached to the fuselage, giving the aircraft a very narrow track, retracting into the fuselage and covered by doors. To reduce drag the engine sat in the nose, under a closely fitting cowling, and cooling radiators sat in ducts either side of the rear fuselage fed by long pipework.

The wings of the RK-I were very unusual in having tandem main-planes, used as guide tracks and supports for the hydraulically extending wing sections, which more than doubled the wing area when fully extended. The wings were of light-alloy and steel structure with 30KhGSA steel skins, only the rear wing having flaps and ailerons.

Unfortunately for the RK-I Joseph Stalin was very interested in the project and insisted that the most powerful engine then available was used in the aircraft. This was the death-knell for the RK-I as the most powerful engine then available was the M-106 which was, unfortunately, a complete failure, not progressing further than bench testing. Construction of the RK-I was complete by 1940, but the aircraft remained un-flown in the workshop due to the unreliable engine.

== Specifications (RK-I) ==
NIAI RK-I

Data from Gunston, Bill. "Encyclopaedia of Russian Aircraft 1875-1995". London:Osprey. 1995. ISBN 1-85532-405-9

General characteristics

- Crew: 1
- Length: 8.8 m (28 ft 10.5 in)
- Wingspan: 8.2 m (26 ft 10.8 in)
- Wing area: 11.9 to 28.0 m^{2} (128 to 301 sq ft)
- Gross weight: 3,100 kg (6,834 lb)
- Powerplant: 1 × M-106 , 1,007 kW (1,350 hp)

Performance

- Maximum speed: 780 km/h (485 mph, 421 kn)

Armament

- 2 x 20mm ShVAK cannon in the nose.
- 2 x 7.62mm ShKAS machine-guns in the nose.

== See also ==
Aircraft of comparable role, configuration, and era

- NIAI RK
- Gérin 1936 Varivol biplane
- Gérin V-6E 'Varivol' Racer

Related lists

- List of aircraft
