= RPF =

RPF may refer to:

== Computing ==
- Raster Product Format, a GIS file format
- Reverse-path forwarding, a technique in multicast routing in networking
- Reverse power feeding, in broadband networking

== Medicine ==
- Renal plasma flow, a metric of the volume of blood delivered to the kidneys
- Retroperitoneal fibrosis, a disease of the retroperitoneum

== Military ==
- Railway Protection Force, a paramilitary organization for railways in India
- Rohingya Patriotic Front, a Rohingya group active in the 1970s and 80s in Bangladesh
- Reichspfenning (1924–1948) (Rpf.), unit of the German Reichsmark

== Political parties ==
- Rassemblement du Peuple Français, France (1947–1955), a Gaullist party
- Rassemblement pour la France, France (1999–2011), a right wing party
- Reformatorische Politieke Federatie, Netherlands (1975–2003), a Protestant Christian party
- Rwandan Patriotic Front, Rwanda (founded 1994), a major political party backed by Paul Kagame

== Other uses ==
- Radioisotope Production Facility, a facility in Inshas, Egypt
- Real person fiction, a genre of fanfiction about real people
- Rehabilitation Project Force, a Scientology program
