= RUC =

RUC may refer to:

- Rádio Universidade de Coimbra or Coimbra University Radio, a Portuguese university station
- Rapid Update Cycle, an atmospheric prediction system
- Renmin University of China, Beijing
- Road User Charges (RUC), taxes payable in New Zealand
- Roskilde University or Roskilde Universitetscenter
- Royal Ulster Constabulary, the police force in Northern Ireland from 1922 to 2001
- Specialty Society Relative Value Scale Update Committee, for US healthcare pricing
- Royal Ulster Constabulary, the police force of Northern Ireland from 1922 to 2001

Ruc may refer to:

- Chut language in Vietnam, also known as Ruc or Ruc-Sach
- Rục people
