= RL =

RL, Rl or rl may refer to:

== In arts and entertainment ==
- Radio Liberty, US broadcaster
- Rocket League, a video game

== Businesses and organizations ==
- Ralph Lauren Corporation (NYSE ticker)
- Réseau Luxembourgeois des Amateurs d'Ondes Courtes, an amateur radio organization in Luxembourg
- Royal Phnom Penh Airways (IATA code)

== People known by the given initials ==
- R. L. Huggar, an R&B singer
- RL Grime, American musician, producer
- R. L. Stine, American author

== In science and technology ==
- RL (complexity), a complexity class of mathematical problems
- RL circuit, a circuit with a resistor and an inductor
- Reinforcement learning, an area of machine learning
- Reduced level, elevations of survey points with reference to a common assumed datum.
- Rhyncholaelia (Rl.), a genus of orchids

== Other uses ==
- Rl (digraph) in Australian Aboriginal languages
- Acura RL, an automobile
- Real life, a phrase
- Registered Locksmith, US certification
- Report Long, a type of US Congressional Research Service Report
- Rugby league, a sport
- Roxbury Latin, a school West Roxbury, Boston, MA
- Liebherr RL series, an offshore crane family manufactured by Liebherr
