= Rangoon Development Trust =

The Rangoon Development Trust (RDT) was as an organization founded in 1920 by the Rangoon Development Trust Act. The Trust oversaw town planning in the Municipality of Rangoon (now Yangon), Burma.

== History ==
The founding of the RDT was one of many early twentieth-century initiatives aimed at improving increasingly difficult living conditions in Rangoon; the municipality was underdeveloped, many thoroughfares were marshy and laden with wooden planks in order to make them navigable. Although the city centre did feature numerous masonry and to a less extent concrete buildings, its residents were housed primarily in flimsy timber structures. The RDT oversaw the creation of new housing for Rangoon's poorer residents, an increasingly limited supply of housing in a town which saw 50 years of British, Chinese and Indian immigration in turn resulted in a property price spiral, pricing many out of the property market. The RDT sought to alleviate these conditions by encouraging migration outwards of Rangoon City Centre towards newer suburbs through the building of better roads as well as reclaiming land East and West of the centre of Rangoon.

== Responsibilities ==
- Maintenance and extension of utilities such as lighting and water-supply.
- Determining suitability and viability of unused land for the purpose of new building projects.
- Allotting land for roads, parks, gardens schools, markets and any other public space intended for public use.
- Preservation of structures of historical interest or natural beauty.

The RDT was responsible for the opening of Scott Market (now Bogyoke Aung San Market) on the site of a former train depot.
