= RCT =

RCT may refer to:

== Science and technology ==
- Random conical tilt, a technique used in cryogenic electron microscopy
- Rational choice theory, a framework for understanding social and economic behavior
- Reverse conducting thyristor
- Ritchey–Chrétien telescope
- Rubber Chemistry and Technology, a scientific journal
- Reversible Color Transform, a technique in computer graphics

== Medicine ==
- Randomized controlled trial, a research method used in medical and social sciences
- Radiochemotherapy, the combination of chemotherapy and radiotherapy to treat cancer
- Root canal treatment, dental treatment to treat nerve damage of the tooth
- Reverse cholesterol transport, pathway by which peripheral cell cholesterol can be returned to the liver for recycling to extrahepatic tissues, hepatic storage, or excretion into the intestine in bile

== Organizations ==
- Ranipokhari Corner Team, a Nepalese football club
- RC Toulonnais, a rugby union club from Toulon, France
- Register of Clinical Technologists (UK)
- Rehabilitation and Research Centre for Torture Victims, Denmark
- Rose City Transit, a former mass transit company in Portland, Oregon
- Royal Corps of Transport, of the British Army
- Rural Community Transportation, a public bus system in Vermont, United States

== Other uses ==
- Rameau Catalogue Thématique, a numbering system used to catalogue the works of Jean-Philippe Rameau
- Regents Competency Test, an alternative standardized test for special education high school students in New York State
- Regimental combat team, in the United States military
- Relational-cultural therapy, in psychology
- Relevant Contracts Tax, in Taxation in the Republic of Ireland
- Rhondda Cynon Taf, a county borough in Wales, UK
- RollerCoaster Tycoon, a video game series
  - RollerCoaster Tycoon (video game), the first game in the series
