= RPA =

RPA may refer to:

== Companies ==
- RPA (Rubin Postaer and Associates), advertising agency, Santa Monica, California, US
- Republic Airways, ICAO code: RPA

== Political groups ==
- Republican Party of Alberta, a minor separatist political party in the Canadian province of Alberta
- Republican Party of Arkansas, the affiliate of the Republican Party in Arkansas
- Republican Party of Armenia, a national conservative political party in Armenia
- Republican Party of Australia, a minor political party
- Revolutionary Proletarian Army, a militant communist organization in the Philippines
- Richmond Progressive Alliance, Contra Costa County, California, US
- Rural Payments Agency of the UK Department for Environment, Food and Rural Affairs
- Rwandan Patriotic Army, predecessor of the Rwandan Defence Forces

== Organizations ==
- Railway Procurement Agency, Ireland
- Rajasthan Police Academy, India
- Regional Plan Association, New York, US
- Register of Professional Archaeologists
- Royal Prince Alfred Hospital, Sydney, Australia
- Rugby Players' Association, England

== Media ==
- RPA (TV series), Australia
- RPA & The United Nations of Sound, a UK band
- Radio del Principado de Asturias, the public radio station of Asturias, Spain

== Science and technology ==
- Random phase approximation, a method in physics
- Remotely piloted aircraft
- Replication protein A
- Recombinase polymerase amplification, isothermal alternative to the polymerase chain reaction (PCR)
- Resolvable Private Address, a security feature of Bluetooth LE
- Robotic process automation, a form of business process automation technology
- RPa

== Other uses ==
- Real Property Administrator
- Registered physician assistant
- Registered Professional Archaeologist
- Request for Public Assistance, a Federal Emergency Management Agency (FEMA) program
- Representation of the People Act, a short title for many legislative Acts in India and the United Kingdom, e.g. Representation of the People Act 1884
- Romanized Popular Alphabet for Hmong language dialects
- Royal Prince Alfred Hospital, Hospital in Sydney, Australia
