= RFA =

RFA may refer to:

== Groups, organizations ==
- Radio Free Asia, a private news broadcaster and publisher in East Asia, funded in part by the U.S. government
- Renewable Fuels Agency, a former UK renewable fuel regulatory agency
- Renewable Fuels Association, a body representing the U.S. ethanol industry
- Report for America, a national service program for emerging journalists in the U.S.
- Rocket Factory Augsburg, a German New Space start-up in Augsburg

=== Military ===
- Royal Field Artillery, a unit of the British Army from 1899 to 1924
- Royal Fleet Auxiliary, a civilian-crewed fleet owned by the United Kingdom's Ministry of Defence

=== Schools ===
- Rome Free Academy, a high school in Rome, New York

=== Sports ===
- Resurrection Fighting Alliance, a former mixed martial arts promotion based in the United States
- Rugby Fives Association, the governing body for the sport of Rugby Fives

== Arts, entertainment, media ==
=== Literature ===
- Royal Frankish Annals, Latin records of the state of the Frankish monarchy from 741 to 829

=== Games ===
- Red Faction: Armageddon, a video game released in 2011
- Ring Fit Adventure, a Nintendo RPG exercise game released in 2019

== Other uses ==
- Radiofrequency ablation, a medical procedure in which tissue is burned away using electrically generated heat
- Regional Forest Agreement, a series of plans for conservation of Australian forests
- Regulatory Flexibility Act, a 1980 act of the U.S. Congress
- Request for admissions, part of US civil law procedures
- Requests for adminship, on Wikipedia
- Restricted free agent, in professional sports

== See also ==
- République fédérale d'Allemagne, the French acronym for the Federal Republic of Germany
