= Rho (disambiguation) =

Rho (Ρ or ρ) is the 17th letter of the Greek alphabet.

Rho or RHO also may refer to:

== Use as a symbol ==
=== Mathematics and statistics ===
- ρ, radial coordinate in the polar coordinate system
- ρ, used in physics instead of r in the spherical coordinate system
- ρ, radial coordinate in the cylindrical coordinate system
- ρ, a term in toroidal coordinates
- ρ, magnetic coordinates in toroidal and poloidal coordinates
- ρ, spectral radius of a square matrix
- Pollard's rho algorithm, for integer factorization
- Pollard's rho algorithm for logarithms
- ρ, prime constant
- ρ, plastic ratio, a geometrical proportion
- ρ, Spearman's rank correlation coefficient in statistics
- ρ, Pearson correlation coefficient in statistics

=== Physics ===
- ρ, density of a material
- ρ, volume charge density
- ρ, electrical resistivity of a material
- Rho meson, in particle physics

=== Other fields ===
- Rho factor, a bacterial protein
- Rho family of GTPases, including RhoA, RhoB, and RhoC
- Rhodopsin, a protein encoded by the RHO gene
- ρ, reaction constant in the Hammett equation in chemistry
- ρ, measures sensitivity to the interest rate in finance

== Places ==
- Rho, Lombardy, Italy
  - Rho railway station
- Ro, Greece, or Rho, a Greek island
- Rho Islands, Antarctica
- Rho River, tributary of the Dora di Bardonecchia, Italy

== Other uses ==
- Right-hand opponent, in contract bridge
- Red Hot Organization, an American non-profit
- Rhodes International Airport, IATA airport code RHO
- Giacomo Rho (1593–1638), Italian Jesuit missionary in China
- The Real Housewives, a reality show commonly referred to with the prefix RHO before an abbreviated location

== See also ==
- RO (disambiguation)
