= ROL =

Rol may refer to:

- Henri Rol-Tanguy, French resistant, "Rol" used to be his nickname during WW2
- Rol, village in Jayal tehsil, Nagaur district, in Rajasthan India
- Rolleston railway station
- Rol Cortishane, fictional character
- The Role, a 2013 Russian film by Konstantin Lopushansky

ROL, as an acronym, may refer to:

- Ray of Light, album by Madonna
- Romanian leu, Romanian currency
- Revue de l'Orient Latin, collection of medieval documents
- Raajjé Online, Maldivian Internet service provider
- Rock of Love with Bret Michaels, an American reality television dating game show
- ROtate bits Left, also known as left circular shift
- Reorder level for replacing used or sold inventory
- Republic of Lakotah, a proposed country and independence movement in the United States
- Rivers of Life, a global organisation of evangelical churches
- Rise of the Lycans the third installment of the Underworld film series
- Republic of Loose, an Irish band
- Risk of loss, a contracts term
- Rank order list
- Rule of law
- Ring of Lightning, an IRC network famous for two members on it leaking the secure boot backdoor key
- RISCOS Ltd, a computer software company
