= RTG =

RTG may refer to:

- RTG (trainset) (Rame à Turbine à Gaz), a French gas turbine trainset
- RTG Turboliner, US import of the French trainset
- Radeon Technologies Group, a division of AMD
- Radio Télévision Guinéenne, Guinea
- Radioisotope thermoelectric generator
- Regular tree grammar, a formal grammar
- Renal threshold of glucose, level at which glucose is excreted in urine
- Retargetable graphics, AmigaOS API
- Royal Thai Government
- Rubber tyred gantry crane
- Frans Sales Lega Airport IATA code
- Roads to Gettysburg, wargame
- Rural Telecommunications Group, trade association representing rural telecommunications companies
