= RTLS =

RTLS may refer to:

- Real-time locating system, an automated system to track people or objects
- Ravenna Training and Logistics Site, an Ohio Army National Guard base
- Return to launch site, a procedure where all or part of an orbital launch vehicle returns to land near the launch site
