= RJD =

RJD may refer to:

- Rashtriya Janata Dal, an Indian political party
- Reduced Julian date, a calendar date format
- Richard J. Donovan Correctional Facility, a prison in California, US
- Ronnie James Dio, an American heavy metal singer
