= Rx (disambiguation) =

Rx or ℞ most commonly refers to a medical prescription.

RX, Rx, ℞, or rx may also refer to:

== Arts and entertainment ==
- ℞ or Rx, a novel by Elizabeth J. Braswell writing as Tracy Lynn
- Rx (band), an industrial rock band
- Rx, a 2016 album by Ryan Beaver
- Rx, a 2024 album by Galantis
- "Rx (Medicate)", a song by Canadian rock band Theory of a Deadman
- "rX" (The Gifted), an episode of the television series The Gifted
- Kamen Rider Black RX, a Japanese superhero television series
- Rx (film), a 2005 romantic thriller film

== Science and technology ==
=== Computing and electronics ===
- Rx (receive, receiver or reception), in various telecommunications applications
  - Rx, the receive signal in the RS-232 serial communication standard
- Rx, the remote procedure call mechanism used by the Andrew File System
- RX, the audio repair software by iZotope
- Radeon RX series, a series of graphics products in the AMD Radeon 400 series
- Reactive extensions, originally for .NET, later ported to other languages and environments
- Rx bridge, a device for measuring the characteristic resistance and impedance of antenna or feedline system
- RX meter, a term used in electrical engineering
- RX microcontroller family, by Renesas Electronics

=== Vehicles ===
- Lexus RX, a series of luxury crossover SUV
- Mazda RX, a series of sport cars
- South Australian Railways R class (Rx class locomotive), of the South Australian Railways
- Yamaha RX 100, a 2-stroke Yamaha motorcycle

=== Other science and technology ===
- Retinal homeobox protein Rx, a transcription factor in vertebrate eye development
- Roket Eksperimental, an Indonesian experimental rocket series

== Organisations ==
- Regent Airways (former IATA code: RX), a former Bangladeshi airline
- Riyadh Air (IATA code: RX), a Saudi airline
- RX, formerly Reed Exhibitions, an exhibition company now part of RELX

== Other uses ==
- Monster RX 93.1, Philippine radio station
- Prescribed burn (Rx burn), in forest management
- Rallycross, a motor sport
- Rye, East Sussex (fishing boat registrations: RX), UK
- ℞, a numismatic abbreviation for reverse
