= RSJ =

RSJ may refer to:

- Religious Sister of St Joseph, post-nominal by members of the Congregation of Sisters of St Joseph of the Sacred Heart
- Rock Street Journal, an Indian rock magazine
- Rolled steel joist or I-beam
- RSJ (band), a metalcore band from York, UK
- Richard Speight Jr., an actor from Nashville, TN
- Ricky Stenhouse Jr., American racing driver
