= RRP =

RRP may refer to:

== Business ==
- Recommended retail price
- Reverse repurchase agreement

== Medicine ==
- Radical retropubic prostatectomy
- Recurrent respiratory papillomatosis

== Other uses ==
- Rembrandt Research Project
- Region of Republican Subordination (Russian: Raiony Respublikanskogo Podchineniya), in Tajikistan
- Rishi Rich Productions
- Renovation, Repair and Painting, a safety regulation for lead-based paint in the United States
