= Report for the World =

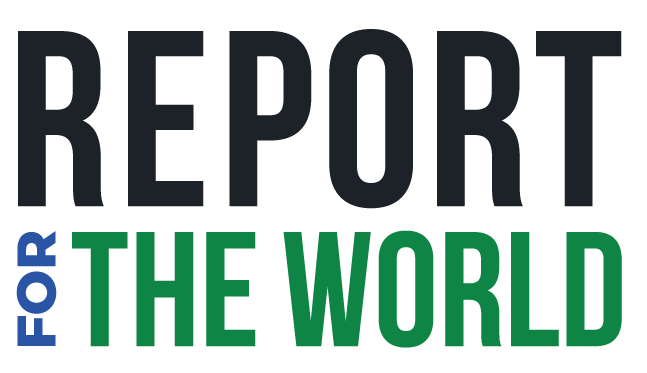

Report for the World (RFW) is a service program that matches local newsrooms with emerging journalists to report on under-covered issues around the globe. It was launched in 2021 as an initiative of The GroundTruth Project, a 501(c)(3) nonprofit journalism organization, in order to train and support teams of emerging journalists around the world. RFW was co-founded by Charles Sennott, the chief executive officer and editor of The GroundTruth Project, and Kevin Grant, GroundTruth's chief content officer. According to Grant, Report for the World is a response to a “global call for more sustainable, more impactful and more local reporting," in an interview with VOA News. Report for the World is closely modeled after its sister program, Report for America.

Report for the World announced the selection of its first six journalists (called corps members), on World Press Freedom Day, May 3, 2021. The corps members were assigned to TheCable in Nigeria and Scroll in India. On Dec. 1, 2021, RFW announced the placement of corps members at InfoAmazonia and Marco Zero Conteúdo in Brazil, The Wire in India, and Premium Times in Nigeria.

== See also ==
- Institute for Nonprofit News (member)
