= RSN =

The initials RSN may refer to:

- Rangers Sports Network
- "Real Soon Now"
- Regional sports network
- Renal Support Network
- Republic of Singapore Navy
- Resort Sports Network
- Robust Security Network in IEEE 802.11i-2004 (WPA2)
- Royal School of Needlework
- Royal Saudi Navy
- RSN Racing & Sport

RSn may refer to:

- Organotin chemistry and related compounds
