= RH =

RH, Rh, rH, or rh may refer to:

== Companies ==
- Red Hat, an American software company
- Republic Express Airlines (IATA designator), a cargo airline in Indonesia
- RH (company), an American furniture chain formerly known as Restoration Hardware

== Science and technology ==
- Relative humidity, a measure of current versus potential humidity
- Releasing hormone
- Reproductive health
- Rh blood group system (Rhesus factor), a classification to describe human blood types
- Rhodium, symbol Rh, a chemical element
- R_{H}, the Rydberg constant for hydrogen
- Riemann hypothesis, an important unsolved problem in mathematics
- Adobe RoboHelp, an Adobe software

== Places ==
- RH postcode area, in the UK
- Republika Hrvatska, an official name of Croatia in Croatian
- Ruttonjee Hospital, a hospital in Wan Chai, Hong Kong

== Other uses ==
- Rh (digraph)
- The Right Honourable, an honorific preceding a name in the UK
- Radical honesty, the practice of complete honesty
- DZRH News Television, a news channel in the Philippines previously known as RHTV
- Richmond Hill line (RH), of the GO Transit rail network in Ontario, Canada

== See also ==
- DZRH, a Philippine radio station
