= RF (disambiguation) =

RF is an abbreviation for radio frequency.

Rf or RF may also refer to:

== Arts and entertainment ==
- Red Faction (series), a series of revolution video games
- Rinforzando, rf, in music notation
- RF Online, an online RPG made by CCR
- RFTV, a Brazilian television network
- Radio Nippon, (a.k.a. RF Radio Nippon, from its call sign JORF), a radio station in Yokohama, Japan

== Business ==
- Aero K, IATA code (2020–present)
- Florida West International Airways, IATA code (1984–2017)
- Regions Financial Corporation, NYSE stock symbol
- Registered association (Finland) (Registrerad förening), Finnish legal status for a non-profit organization
- Royalty-free, in business

== Government and politics ==
- France (République française)
- Russian Federation
- Rhodesian Front, former political party in Rhodesia
- Radnička fronta (Workers' Front (Croatia)), political party
- Revolutionary Front (Sweden), political organisation

== Biology and medicine ==
- Rheumatic fever, an inflammatory disease
- Release factors RF1, RF2, RF3, proteins
- Reticular formation, in the brainstem
- Rheumatoid factor, an antibody
- Receptive field, the response characteristic of a neuron
- Respiratory failure
- Risk factor

== Other uses in science and technology ==
- Representative fraction
- Rest frame
- Retardation factor in a chromatographic system
- Radiative forcing, the change in energy flux in the atmosphere caused by climate change factors
- Random forest, an ensemble learning method in data science
- Rutherfordium, symbol Rf, a chemical element
- Canon RF mount, interchangeable camera lens mount
- Rangefinder camera, a camera using a range-finding focusing mechanism

== Sports ==
- Range Factor, a baseball statistic
- Right fielder, a defensive position in baseball
- Roger Federer, a Swiss tennis player
- Swedish Sports Confederation (Swedish: Riksidrottsförbundet, RF), the umbrella organisation for Swedish sports
