= RFI =

RFI may refer to:

== Organisations ==
- Radio France Internationale, a French international radio broadcaster
  - RFI România, the radio's branch in Romania, its biggest international branch
- Rete Ferroviaria Italiana, the Italian railway infrastructure manager
- Rifle Factory Ishapore, an arms manufacturing facility at Ichapore, India
- Rowing Federation of India, the central body for the sport of rowing in India

== Other uses ==
- Radio-frequency interference
- Remote File Inclusion, a type of web application exploit
- Request for information, a business process
- Request for information (parliamentary procedure), a parliamentary procedure

== See also ==
- Radio-frequency identification or RFID, radio frequency identification
