= RFT =

RFT may refer to:

- Rational Functional Tester, IBM software
- Regulatory focus theory, a psychological theory
- Relational frame theory, a psychological theory
- Remote field testing, a materials testing method with low-frequency AC
- Request for tender, an invitation to product or service suppliers
- Revisable-Form Text, part of IBM's Document Control Architecture (DCA)
- Riverfront Times, an alternative weekly newspaper in St. Louis, Missouri, US
- Ron Finemore Transport, Australian logistics company
