= Royal Signals Association =

PATRON - The Princess Royal PRESIDENT - The Master of Signals

The Royal Signals Association (RSA) was established on 28 June 1920, following the signing of a Royal Warrant by the Secretary of State for War, Winston S. Churchill. This warrant granted sovereign approval for the formation of a dedicated Corps of Signals, which was separated from the Royal Engineers Signal Service. Six weeks later, on 5 August 1920, King George V bestowed the honorary title “Royal Corps of Signals,” recognising the corps’ elevated status and its significant contribution to military communications within the British Army. The objects of the Association are:

- To provide comfort and relief either generally or individually to past and present signallers and their dependants who are in conditions of need, hardship or distress.
- To foster comradeship and morale within the Corps family, serving and retired.

== Structure ==
Working within Regimental Headquarters Royal Signals, based in Blandford Camp, Dorset, are the Royal Signals Benevolent Fund Grants Section and the Royal Signals Association Branches and Membership Section. The RSBF Grants Section assists signallers by way of grants of money or paying for items to reduce hardship and distress suffered by serving and former members of the Corps. Over £300,000 is allocated annually from this section. The Membership Section maintains records of all the 63 branches located throughout the country and their members, plus those of affiliated groups, which are linked to the Corps through unit history or location. Any person who served with the Corps, including Regular, TA, National Service, ATS and WRAC is eligible to join the association. Spouses are eligible to become Associate Members of the Association, through a branch.

=== Branches ===
There are 63 local branches which meet regularly and are all around the UK. Members may enjoy the company of fellow former Corps members and are kept informed of the latest happenings within the Association and Corps. They hold a variety of other activities, including annual dinners and outings. More than half the branches have their own standard, which is paraded at special events, both locally and nationally. Additionally, branches usually make an effort for their standard to be present at funerals of members. The association has divided the UK into 7 areas, each with its own Area Representative. Each branch is linked to the association's Central Committee by its Area Representative. The Committee meets twice a year, in spring and autumn, and is currently chaired by the Chairman of the Association. The day-to-day affairs are overseen by the General Secretary, who is also known as the Regimental Secretary to the Corps.
