= RTGS =

RTGS may refer to:

- Real-time gross settlement
- Royal Thai General System of Transcription
- RTGS Dollar, Zimbabwe's currency since 2019
