= RDD =

RDD may refer to:

- Adygeya Airlines, by ICAO airline designator
- Radar detector detector
- Radiological dispersion device, a weapon designed to spread radioactive material
- Rally for Democracy and Development (Rassemblement pour la Démocratie et le Développement), a political party in the Republic of the Congo
- Random digit dialing, a method for selecting people for involvement in telephone surveys
- Redding Municipal Airport (IATA airport code), a public airport near Redding, California
- Regression discontinuity design, a statistical technique
- Replaceable Database Driver (or Replicable Database Driver), a component of computer software that performs database operations, supported by languages such as Clipper
- Renault Driver Development, a program created by Renault F1 to support young racing drivers
- Resilient Distributed Dataset, the central data structure of Apache Spark
- Responsibility-driven design, a software development methodology in which the system is modeled as a collection of objects that collaborate to fulfill the responsibilities
- Riddlesdown railway station (National Rail station code), London, England
- Rosai–Dorfman disease, a disorder characterized by abundant histiocytes in lymph nodes and elsewhere in the body
- Rubber duck debugging, an informal term used in software engineering for a method of debugging code
