= Running with Rifles =

Tactical shooter game

- Developer: Osumia Games
- Designer: Osumia Games
- Engine: OGRE
- Platforms: Microsoft Windows, OS X, Linux
- Release: April 2, 2015
- Genre: Action
- Modes: Single-player, multiplayer

Running with Rifles is a 2015 top-down open world tactical shooter game published and developed by Osumia Games (previously Modulaatio Games). It was developed by Pasi Kainiemi in Tampere, Finland, and Jack Mayol in Stuttgart, Germany, working under the team name Modulaatio Games (now Osumia Games).

The game is primarily voxel-based, with the map texturing done using "splat map" texture layering, and with the modeling being done with typically low-poly or simple .mesh files. Because of this, the game runs very well on old hardware, making it more accessible to more players.

== Gameplay ==
Running with Rifles is a down top shooter where the player takes on the role of an infantryman during a large conflict in multiple different regions for either the Greenbelts, the Greycollars, or the Brownpants.

Running with Rifles main feature is its extensive single-player campaign, with adjustable settings for the enemy and friendly AI. While in game, friendly AI and units will counterattack and defend territory regardless of the players actions. Although a commander designates attack orders for the player's faction, the open world mechanic gives the player the ability to run around and capture any point on the map at any time, and disregarding the commander's orders will not incur a penalty. On harder difficulties, the player will need to flank, communicate, attack and defend simultaneously to counteract the enemy forces. The game is open ended and the player has access to powerful vehicles, the ability to command small squads of soldiers, and to call in powerful artillery barrages that allow for many different play styles. In game looting of enemies for supplies, and sabotaging the enemies's important structures and buildings will also play a role in winning the battle.

== Development ==
Osumia Games (known as Modulaatio Games at its creation) started as a two-man independent development studio run by Pasi Kainiemi. He started developing Running with Rifles in early 2011. The game left pre-alpha on July 18, 2011. The game received minor updates during alpha before continuing into beta on September 14, 2011, where it spent most of its life.

In 2011 he made the game available for pre-order. In early 2012 Jack Mayol joined the team and they decided together to push the game far beyond what was originally planned. The first Linux port was made publicly available and the game was put on Steam Greenlight, where it was later accepted and put onto the Steam Store. Two new King of The Hill maps were added and a single-player Invasion mode was added/enhanced during 2013. In 2014 the game was released onto Steam's Early Access platform and the first Mac (OS X) port is made available.

In 2015, on April 2, the game left Steam's Early Access/left beta and was officially released.

At some point prior to the DLC's official release, the team was expanded with the addition of three community modders who assisted in the development of Pacific, and who are currently involved in the upcoming DLC Edelweiss. In the community, these developers are known as TheSoldier, Tremozl, and 577.

== Downloadable content ==
On October 26, 2017, the first pack of downloadable content (DLC) was released - "Pacific" has players and their team (Imperial Japanese Army or United States Marine Corps) fight in the Pacific Theater in World War II. The DLC adds new vehicles, such as landing craft and patrol boats, and adds new water craft. It also features a new weapon set, with bolt-action rifles such as the Type 99, combat rifles such as the M1 Garand, and the ability to place bayonets onto weapons, allowing extra melee mechanics. It also features a new side objective system, featuring new side objectives such as "Destroy the AA Gun" or "Repair the abandoned tank".

On September 24, 2018, the second DLC pack was announced - titled "Edelweiss", it follows the Allied airborne campaigns across western Europe in late 1944, beginning during Operation Overlord, and featuring both British and American forces fighting against the Wehrmacht.

== Reception ==
Reception

Aggregate score
Aggregator	Score
Metacritic	78/100

Running with Rifles has a 78/100 rating on the review aggregator site Metacritic, based on four reviews from critics. Kotaku writer Kirk Hamilton said the game is similar to both Battlefield and Hotline Miami.

The game was described as a simple to jump into and play type of game, and was described as a modern-day Cannon Fodder. The single-player has the same structural play as the multi-player version so players who prefer solo play won't have to worry about missing out on key features of the game.

== Sequel ==
A sequel, known as RWR2, has been officially announced on June 6, 2024 with a teaser video.
