= RRS =

RRS may stand for:

- Racing Rules of Sailing, a set of rules governing the conduct of yacht racing, windsurfing and many other forms of racing with wind-powered vessels
- Railroad Station, see Train Station
- Rapid Response Services, a humanitarian logistics service operating in Darfur
- Rational Response Squad
- Radiation Research Society
- Reaction Research Society
- Red River Shootout, an annual football game between University of Texas and University of Oklahoma
- Relative rate of spoilage, a mathematical model used to predict the shelf life of some food products
- Rentsys Recovery Services, a provider of Disaster Recovery and Business Continuity Solutions
- Resource Recovery Services (z/OS feature)
- Reutech Radar Systems
- Royal Regiment of Scotland
- Royal Research Ship
- Ryan Rowland-Smith, baseball player
- The IATA airport code for Røros Airport
- Realistic Robot Simulation, a joint project between robot manufacturers and suppliers of robot simulation software
- Reconfigurable Radio Systems, a generic concept based on wireless technologies
