= RLS =

RLS may refer to:

== Education ==
- Royal Latin School, a grammar school in Buckingham, England
- Stevenson School, formerly Robert Louis Stevenson School, California

== Science and technology ==
- Recursive least squares filter, in minimisation
- Regularized least squares, for solving least-squares problems
- Reef Life Survey, a marine monitoring program in Tasmania
- Restless legs syndrome, a medical disorder

== Other uses ==
- Real-life slash, a subgenre of real person fiction
- Rial (disambiguation), plural abbreviation Rls, Middle Eastern currency units
- Robert Louis Stevenson, Scottish writer
