= RNS =

RNS may be an initialism for:

- Rabid Neurosis, a music piracy organisation
- RNS formalism in the string theory of physics
- Reactive nitrogen species
- Regulatory News Service
- Religion News Service
- Rennes - Saint-Jacques Airport, France, IATA code
- Residue numeral system in mathematics
- Responsive neurostimulation device, an epilepsy treatment
- Reticulum Network Stack, cryptography-based networking stack
- "R.N.S.", a song by Slaughterhouse from Southpaw: Music from and Inspired By the Motion Picture
