= RMP =

RMP may refer to:

- Rajshahi Metropolitan Police, the police force in Rajshahi, Bangladesh
- RateMyProfessors.com, a website for student ratings of college instructors
- "Reprogrammable microprocessor", variant of the FIM-92 Stinger anti-aircraft missile
- Registered medical practitioner
- Resonant magnetic perturbations, a plasma physics technique used in tokamak fusion reactors
- Resting membrane potential, electrical potential across a cell membrane
- Reviews of Modern Physics, a journal published by the American Physical Society
- Revolutionary Marxist Party, a political party in India (Kerala)
- Rhind Mathematical Papyrus, an ancient Egyptian manuscript
- Rifampicin, an antibiotic
- Risk management plan, an element of risk management
- RMP, IATA code for Rampart Airport, Alaska
- Royal Malaysian Police, Malaysian police force
- Royal Marine Police, a former British civil police force which guarded Admiralty establishments
- Royal Military Police, British army police
- Royal Melbourne Philharmonic, an Australian choir and orchestra
- Russian Maoist Party, a Russian political party founded in 2000
