= RASC =

RASC may be:

- Reconfigurable Application-Specific Computing, a specialized reconfigurable computer for high-performance computing
- Research and Advocacy Standing Committee, part of the Singapore Children's Society
- Royal Army Service Corps, a former corps of the British Army
- Royal Astronomical Society of Canada, formed in 1903

The former Royal Australian Survey Corps is sometimes incorrectly abbreviated RASC. Its correct abbreviation is RASvy.
