= RQ =

RQ may refer to:

- RQ series, a reconnaissance unmanned aerial vehicle designator of the United States Defense Department
- Kam Air (IATA designator RQ)
- Puerto Rico (FIPS 10-4 country code RQ)
- Reference Quarterly
- Renaissance Quarterly, a scholarly journal published by the Renaissance Society of America
- Respiratory quotient, used in calculations of basal metabolic rate
- RuneQuest, a role-playing game
- Research question, the formulation of which is often the first step in a research process
