= RSVP (disambiguation) =

An RSVP is a request for a response to an invitation.

RSVP or R.S.V.P. may also refer to:

== Arts, entertainment, and media ==
=== Film ===
- R.S.V.P. (1984 film), an American film
- R.S.V.P. (2002 film), a horror film
- RSVP (1991 film), a short film directed by Laurie Lynd
- RSVP Movies, an Indian film production company

=== Games ===
- RSVP (board game), a vertical version of Scrabble

=== Music ===
- R.S.V.P. (supergroup), an American R&B and hip hop group developed as a result of the podcast Verzuz
- R.S.V.P. (Rare Songs, Very Personal), an album by Nancy Wilson, 2004

==== Songs ====
- "R.S.V.P." (Five Star song), 1985
- "R.S.V.P.", by Boney James & Rick Braun from Shake It Up, 2000
- "RSVP", by Half Man Half Biscuit from 90 Bisodol (Crimond), 2011
- "RSVP", by Heart from Bad Animals, 1987
- "R.S.V.P.", by Jason Donovan from Greatest Hits, 1991
- "RSVP", by Knuckle Puck from 20/20, 2020
- "RSVP", by Maren Morris from Girl, 2019
- "R.S.V.P.", by Nesian Mystik from Elevator Musiq, 2008
- "R.S.V.P.", by Pop Will Eat Itself, 1993

== Enterprises and organizations ==
- Resolve to Stop Violence Project, a program to try to help incarcerated prisoners recognize their violent attitudes and change them
- Retired and Senior Volunteer Program, a volunteerism promotion by Senior Corps
- RSVP Technologies Inc., an artificial intelligence company based in Canada
- RSVP.com.au, an Australian dating site

== Science and technology ==
- Rapid serial visual presentation, a visual presentation method used in vision research and speed reading
- Resource Reservation Protocol, a computer network protocol
