= RDV =

RDV may refer to:

- Rice dwarf virus
- RDV Sports, Inc., an American corporation
- Radio Dunyaa Vision (RDV)
- Remdesivir, a drug
