= RRB =

RRB may refer to:

- The Indian Railway Recruitment Board
- The U.S. Railroad Retirement Board
- Regional Rural Banks, a type of financial institution in India
- Renters' Rights Bill, legislation in the United Kingdom
- Blindism, restricted or repetitive behavior in visually impaired children
