= RTCA =

RTCA or rTCA may refer to:

- Radio Technical Commission for Aeronautics, an American aviation standards organisation
- Radio and Television Correspondents' Association, an American journalism organization
- Reverse tricarboxylic acid cycle
- Rio Tinto Coal Australia, an Australian coal mining company
- Rivers, Trails and Conservation Assistance Program, a special division of the US National Park Service
