= RWS =

The three-letter abbreviation RWS may stand for:

== Businesses and organizations ==
- Ravens Wood School, Keston, London Borough of Bromley, England
- Rijkswaterstaat, Dutch water management agency
- Royal Watercolour Society, an English institution of painters working in watercolours
- Running with Scissors (company), a video game developer
- RWS Group, World's largest patent translation and localisation services provider

== Sports ==
- RWS Bruxelles, a Belgian football club
- RWS Motorsport, an auto racing team based in Anger, Bavaria, Germany
- Rajadamnern World Series, a Muay Thai promotion located at Rajadamnern Stadium

== Weapons ==
- 6.5 X 68 RWS, a cartridge produced by Rheinisch-Westfälische Sprengstoffwerke for the Mauser 98 bolt-action rifle
- Remote weapon station, a weapon mounting used on some armored military vehicles

== Other uses ==
- Audi R8 RWS, the rear wheel series of Audi R8 sports car
- ISO 639:rws or Musi, a Malayan language
- RESTful web service, appears in Whois-RWS, a type of Internet number lookup service
- Resorts World Sentosa, an integrated resort in Singapore
- Romano–Ward syndrome, a condition that causes a disruption of the heart's normal rhythm
- Roulette wheel selection, a selection genetic operator in Genetic algorithms
- Rider–Waite-Smith tarot deck
- An abbreviation used for the children's book series, the Railway Series.
