= RVD (disambiguation) =

RVD is a ring name of Rob Van Dam (born 1970), American wrestler.

RVD or RvD may also refer to:

- Rijksvoorlichtingsdienst, the Netherlands Government Information Service
- RVD, IATA airport code for Rio Verde Airport, Rio Verde, Brazil
- Ryan vs. Dorkman, abbreviated RvD, a series of Star Wars fan films
