= RGBI =

RGBI could refer to:

- Rio Grande Bible Institute
- RGBI interface — Red, Green, Blue, Intensity; a color format, most commonly used in an RGBI cathode ray tube monitor interface
