= RADC =

RADC may be:

- Rome Air Development Center, the former name of the United States Air Force's Rome Laboratory
- Royal Army Dental Corps, former corps of the British Army
- Rush Alzheimer's Disease Center, a research center at Rush University
