= RCZ =

RCZ may refer to:

- Peugeot RCZ, a 2+2 sports coupé designed and marketed by PSA Group under the Peugeot marque
- Richmond County Airport (FAA LID: RCZ), a public airport in North Carolina, United States
