= RPN =

RPN may refer to:

== Science and technology ==
- Real projective space ($\mathbb{R}\mathrm{P}^n,$), a type of topological space
- Reverse Polish notation, a.k.a. postfix notation, a mathematical notation
- Registered Parameter Number, in MIDI
- Recherche en Prévision Numérique, weather forecasting research service, Canada
- Risk priority number in failure analysis such as FMEA, taking into account the severity, probability and detection probability of a failure event

== Nursing ==
- Registered practical nurse, nursing title
- Registered psychiatric nurse, nursing title specialising mental health

== Other uses ==
- Radio Philippines Network, a state-sequestered television network
- Rosh Pina Airport (IATA code), Israel
- Rancangan Perumahan Negara (National Housing Programme), public housing in Brunei
