= RWH =

RWH may refer to:

- Rainwater harvesting
- Random walk hypothesis
- Red wine headache a bad headache that occurs in many people after drinking even a single glass of red wine
- Revolutionary Workers Headquarters, a U.S. Marxist-Leninist organization that formed out of a split from the Revolutionary Communist Party (RCP) in 1977
- Ridley–Watkins–Hilsum theory
- Real World Haskell, a book about the Haskell programming language
