= Rutana (languages) =

Rutana is an Arabic term applied to any of Sudan's many non-Arabic vernacular languages and often taken to be pejorative.
