= Royal Military College =

Royal Military College may refer to:

Australia

- Royal Military College, Duntroon, Campbell, Australian Capital Territory

Canada

- Royal Military College of Canada, Kingston, Ontario
- Royal Military College Saint-Jean, Saint-Jean, Quebec

India

- Rashtriya Indian Military College, Dehradun; formerly Royal Indian Military College

Malaysia

- Royal Military College (Malaysia), Kuala Lumpur

United Kingdom

- Royal Military College, Sandhurst, Camberley, Surrey - the predecessor to the current Sandhurst Academy
- Royal Military College of Science (now defunct)
- Royal Indian Military College, Addiscombe, of the East India Company (now defunct)

== See also ==
- Royal Military Academy (disambiguation)
