= RFR =

RFR may refer to:

- Radio Free Roscoe, a Canadian TV series
- Ralph Firman Racing, a British racecar constructor
- Recovering from Religion, an organisation
- Regional Fast Rail project, Victoria, Australia
- Reichsforschungsrat (RFR, Reich Research Council)
- Réseau Ferroviaire Rapide, a rail network in Tunisia
- RFR Engineers, a design engineering firm
- RFR Holding
- Right of first refusal
- Rio Frio, Costa Rica, ICAO airport code
- Steyr Scout RFR rifle
- Team RFR, a Russian auto racing team
- Roush Fenway Racing, a NASCAR team
