= RWA =

RWA may refer to:

== Business and Finance ==
- Real-World Asset, an asset class intrinsic to blockchains and cryptocurrencies
- Risk-weighted asset, a bank risk management variable usually used in the context of Basel II

== Organizations ==
- Race Walking Association, a professional sports body in the UK
- Resident welfare association, any self-organised group (particularly in India) which claims to represent the residents of a specified region
- Romance Writers of America, a genre-specific writers association
- Rot Weiss Ahlen, a football club in Ahlen, North Rhine-Westphalia, Germany
- Royal West of England Academy, an art gallery and academy in Clifton, Bristol, UK
- Royal West Academy, a secondary school in Montreal, Quebec, Canada
- Republic of Western Armenia, a self-proclaimed government-in-exile claiming Western Armenia, and sometimes Artsakh and Nakhchivan

== Science and technology ==
- Reaction wheel assembly, in spacecraft control
- Right-wing authoritarianism, a psychological personality variable
- Rotating-wave approximation, a mathematical simplification used in atom optics and magnetic resonance
- Routing and wavelength assignment, a process in optical network routing

== Other uses ==
- Research Works Act, proposed US law (2011) to prohibit requiring free public access to results of federally funded research
- RWA, abbreviation for Rwanda, an east-central African country
- Ryan White Act (Ryan White CARE Act), US law providing assistance to people living with HIV/AIDS
- Rwa language, spoken in Tanzania
