= Retiree Drug Subsidy =

The Retiree Drug Subsidy Program is a program offered by the Centers for Medicare & Medicaid Services (CMS) to reimburse health plan sponsors (municipalities, unions and private employers) for a portion of their eligible expenses for retiree prescription drug benefits. This enables Plan Sponsors to continue providing drug coverage to their Medicare-eligible retirees at a lower cost.

Benefits of the RDS Program for participating Plan Sponsors include:

- A Federal subsidy equal to 28-percent Qualifying Covered Retiree's costs for prescription drugs otherwise covered by Medicare Part D that are attributable to such drug costs between the applicable Cost Threshold and Cost Limit
- Incurred costs (including dispensing fees) that the Health Plan Sponsor pays, and that the retiree pays, are eligible for subsidy. Rebates received are subtracted from the amount eligible for subsidy.
- Program flexibility that supports the Health Plan Sponsor's current prescription drug plan structure
- Extensive educational materials and support

To qualify for the subsidy, a Health Plan Sponsor must show that its coverage is "actuarially equivalent" to, or at least as generous as, the defined standard Medicare Part D coverage.
