= Realtime Trains =

British rail tracker website

- Available in: English
- Area served: Great Britain
- Founder: Tom Cairns
- Website: www.realtimetrains.co.uk
- Advertising: Yes
- Commercial: Yes
- Registration: No
- Launched: October 2012; 13 years ago
- Current status: Active

Realtime Trains is a website that tracks trains on the British railway network.

== History ==
Realtime Trains was launched in October 2012 by Tom Cairns, a student at the University of Southampton.

In March 2020, Abellio ScotRail became the first operator to share additional rolling stock information with Realtime Trains. The additional information was dubbed Know Your Train, and includes a visual overview of the type of rolling stock and number of carriages used by each service. Operators which now offer this information include Northern Trains and TransPennine Express. In May 2021, Realtime Trains stated that 45% of the distance travelled by trains on the British railway network was covered by Know Your Train.

Another service called Track Your Train was added in September 2020, offering advanced notice of platform alterations and potential delays to a service. Initially, Track Your Train is only available on selected services starting at London Liverpool Street.

Following a grant from the Culture Recovery Fund, in 2021 Realtime Trains installed live departure boards for Swanage Railway heritage services at Corfe Castle and Swanage stations.

On 1 April 2025, Realtime Trains launched Realtime Tickets, a train ticket retail website which supports split ticketing, in collaboration with TrainSplit.

On 15 October 2025, "RTT+" was launched - a subscription service offering enhanced history (up to 5 years), CSV schedule data download and removal of on page ads. Subscriptions start from £5 per month, whilst registered but non-paying users benefit from 1 month schedule look back, increased from the 14 days available to non-registered users.

== Data sources ==
The data presented on Realtime Trains is created using a variety of sources and human input. In 2017, Realtime Trains installed GPS tracking devices in trains to allow services to be tracked during a diesel gala on the Swanage Railway.
