= RWF =

RWF may refer to:

- Rainer Werner Fassbinder, German film director
- Rassemblement Wallonie-France, a minor Belgian political party
- Royal Welch Fusiliers, a British Army regiment
- Rwandan franc, in ISO 4217 code, a currency
- Royal Agricultural Winter Fair, Toronto, often abbreviated to Royal Winter Fair
- Republic of West Florida, a short-lived republic
- Rail Wheel Factory, Bangalore, India
- San José–Santa Clara Regional Wastewater Facility, a wastewater treatment plant in San Jose, California
