= RSR =

RSR is a three letter acronym which may refer to:

- Radio Suisse Romande the Swiss French public service radio group
- Railway Safety Regulator, an agency of the South African government
- Retail Systems Research, a research company for the retail industry
- Former international license plate code for Southern Rhodesia
- Rock Structure Rating
- Rochester and Southern Railroad
- Romanian Socialist Republic or Republica Socialistă România, the name of Communist Romania from 1965 to 1989
- Ronald Suresh Roberts (born 1968), British West Indian biographer and columnist
- Rotary Scout Reservation, a Boy Scout camp in upstate New York
- RSR (spyplane), a Russian supersonic surveillance aircraft
- RSR ("RennSport Rennwagen"), race versions of the Porsche 911
- RSR Round Sheffield Run, A multi stage trail run that happens in January and June every year in Sheffield.
