= RBI =

RBI most often refers to:

- Reserve Bank of India
- Run batted in
- Royal Black Institution

RBI may also refer to:

== Organisations ==
- Radio Berlin International
- Raiffeisen Bank International
- Reed Business Information
- Restaurant Brands International
- Ruđer Bošković Institute

== Other ==
- Reactive business intelligence
- Relative bearing indicator
- Reviving Baseball in Inner Cities
- Risk-based inspection
- Rubidium iodide

== See also ==
- R.B.I. Baseball (baseball video game series)
