= RLP =

RLP may refer to:

== Medicine and chemistry ==
- 2,3-diketo-5-methylthiopentyl-1-phosphate enolase, an enzyme
- Regional limb perfusion, a method of medication delivery in animals.
- Round Ligament Pain, a pain of the round ligament of uterus

== Computing ==
- Radio Link Protocol, an automatic repeat request fragmentation protocol used over a wireless (typically cellular) air interface
- RLP (complexity), the complexity class of problems solvable by a probabilistic machine in logarithmic space and polynomial time with one-sided error

== Other uses ==
- Rashtriya Loktantrik Party, an independent political party in India.
- Reel Life Productions, an independent record label founded by rapper Esham
- Rhineland-Palatinate, a federal state of the Federal Republic of Germany
- Riverside Long Playing, serial number for Riverside Records LP albums
- Rohingya Liberation Party, Rakhine State, Myanmar
