= Royal Military Academy =

Royal Military Academy may refer to:

- Royal Military Academy, Woolwich, a British Army academy established in 1741 and closed in 1939
- Royal Military Academy Sandhurst, a British Army academy established in 1947
- Royal Military Academy (Belgium), the military university of Belgium
- Meknes Royal Military Academy, Morocco
- Koninklijke Militaire Academie, the Army and Air Force university of the Netherlands
- Chulachomklao Royal Military Academy, Thailand
- Royal Military Academy, now Military Academy Karlberg, Sweden

== See also ==
- Royal Military College (disambiguation)
