= RFQ =

RFQ is the initialism for a number of things:

- Radio-frequency quadrupole, a particular setup of electrodes used as a mass analyzer or an element of a linear accelerator.
- Regulatory Focus Questionnaire, a questionnaire designed to measure prevention focus and promotion focus.
- Request for quotation, a (general) request for a quote to perform work.
- Request for quote, a (specific) financial term when asking a bank for an offer of a financial instrument.
- Request for qualifications, the qualification request for a position, job or work.
