= Return to Flight =

Return to Flight can refer to:

- Apollo 7, NASA's first mission after the Apollo 1 fire
- Apollo 14, NASA's first mission after the failure of Apollo 13
- Falcon 9 Flight 20
- Space Shuttle mission STS-26, NASA's first mission after the Space Shuttle Challenger disaster
- Space Shuttle mission STS-114, NASA's first test mission after the Space Shuttle Columbia disaster
- Space Shuttle mission STS-121, NASA's second test mission following the Columbia disaster
- ISRO's successful launch of GSLV-D5 with indigenously developed CE-7.5 cryogenic rocket engine
