= RFP (disambiguation) =

RFP may refer to:

- 25 metre rapid fire pistol, an ISSF Olympic shooting event
- Public Francophone Radios (French: Radios francophones publiques)
- Radio fixed part, in digital enhanced cordless telecommunications
- Raffles Place MRT station, in Singapore (MRT station abbreviation)
- Raiatea Airport, in French Polynesia
- Red fluorescent protein
- Religions for Peace
- Request for production, in civil procedure
- Request for proposal
- Resolute Forest Products, a Canadian pulp and paper company
- Reversed field pinch
- Revolution for Prosperity, a political party in Lesotho
- Richmond, Fredericksburg and Potomac Railroad, a defunct American railroad
- Rock for People, a Czech music festival
- Russian Fascist Party
- Regna firmat pietas, a former motto of Denmark and Norway
