= RMC =

RMC may refer to:

== Businesses ==
- Rauma Marine Constructions, a Finnish shipbuilding company
- Rail Management Corporation, an American railroad holding company
- RMC Group, a British construction supplies company
- Rocky Mountain Construction, an American roller coaster construction company

== Government and military ==
- Metropolitan Region of Caracas (Spanish: Región Metropolitana de Caracas)
- Raipur Municipal Corporation, Chhattisgarh, India
- Rajamahendravaram Municipal Corporation, Andhra Pradesh, India
- Rajkot Municipal Corporation, Gujarat, India
- Ranchi Municipal Corporation, Jharkhand, India
- Rewa Municipal Corporation, Madhya Pradesh, India
- Royal Medical Corps (Malaysia), of the Malaysian Armed Forces
- Royal Marine Commando, British Armed Forces

== Medical centers ==
- Rizal Medical Center, in Pasig, Philippines
- Reception and Medical Center, in Florida, United States

== Schools ==
- Randolph–Macon College, Virginia
- Rawalpindi Medical College, now Rawalpindi Medical University, in Pakistan
- Rajshahi Medical College, Bangladesh
- Rangpur Medical College, Bangladesh
- Regina Mundi Catholic College, London, Ontario, Canada
- Rhythmic Music Conservatory, Copenhagen
- Robert Morris College, mow Robert Morris University Illinois, in Chicago, Illinois
- Rocky Mountain College, in Billings, Montana
- Rocky Mountain College (Calgary), Alberta
- Royal Military College of Canada, Kingston, Ontario
- Royal Military College, Duntroon, Campbell, Australia
- Royal Military College (Malaysia), Kuala Lumpur, Malaysia
- Royal Military College Saint-Jean, Quebec
- Royal Military College, Sandhurst, Surrey, England

== Technology ==
- Rack mount chassis
- Radiative muon capture
- Ready-mix concrete
- Reverse Monte Carlo, a modelling method
- Rigid metal conduit, a type of electrical conduit

== Other uses ==
- Carpathian Romani, a dialect group of the Romani language
- Radio Monte Carlo, a radio station operation in France, Monaco and Italy
  - RMC (France), a French-Monégasque radio station
- RMC, a brand of Realtek chips
- Rainbow Motorcycle Club, an American motorcycle club
- Rebels Motorcycle Club, an international outlaw motorcycle club that was originally founded in Australia
  - Rebels Motorcycle Club (Canada)
- Renal medullary carcinoma
- Riley RMC, a British automobile
- Rocky Mountain Conference, now the Rocky Mountain Athletic Conference
- Rotax Max Challenge, a kart racing series
- Rotherham Central station, in South Yorkshire, England
- Royal Marines Cadets, part of the Sea Cadets in the United Kingdom
- Russell Midcap Index, a stock market index
