= RDM =

RDM may refer to:

== Businesses ==
- Rheinmetall Denel Munition, a military technology group, Germany
- Rheinmetall Denel Munition South Africa, a military technology group, South Africa
- Richardson Devine Marine, an Australian shipbuilding company
- Rotterdamsche Droogdok Maatschappij, a Netherlands shipbuilding and repair company

== Military ==
- Radar Doppler Multifunction, a French stopgap radar for the Mirage 2000 fighter plane
- Radarman, a former rating of the United States Navy

== Music ==
- Rhythms del Mundo, a nonprofit salsa and mambo album by Cuban musicians
- Il Rovescio della Medaglia, an Italian symphonic rock band

== Science and technology ==
- Rapid Development Methodology, a software development process developed by Lynn G. Gref and Dr. William Spuck
- Raw Disk Mapping, hard disk mapping for use by a virtual disk image
- Reduced density matrix, in the Contracted Schrödinger Equation method for finding the electronic structure of molecules
- RDM (lighting) (Remote Device Management), an electronic protocol used in stage lighting
- Research data management, the organisation of research data

== Transportation ==
- Riding Mill railway station (National Rail station code), Northumberland, England
- Roberts Field (IATA airport code), an airport in Redmond, Oregon, US

== People ==
- Robert Douglas McIntyre (1913–1998), Scottish nationalist politician
- Roberto Di Matteo (born 1970), Italian football player
- Ronald D. Moore (born 1964), American screenwriter and TV producer of Star Trek and Battlestar Galactica
- Raphael Maklouf (born 1937), British sculptor and designer of the third coinage portrait of Elizabeth II
- Robert Duncan McNeill (born 1964), American producer, director, and actor

== Other uses ==
- Roy D. Mercer, a fictional prank-calling radio character
- Robust decision-making, a framework that helps identify and evaluate robust strategies under deep uncertainty
- Red Mage, a character class from the Dungeons & Dragons and Final Fantasy games
- Republica Democratică Moldovenească (Moldavian Democratic Republic), a former state

== See also ==
- RDMS (disambiguation)
