= RM =

RM, rm, R.M. or R&M may refer to:

== Arts and entertainment ==
- Random map, a randomly generated map in strategy games
- RauteMusik.FM, a German Internet Radio Station
- RM (musician), born Kim Nam-joon, a South Korean rapper, composer and person who produces music
- The R.M., a comedy film
- Running Man (TV program), a South Korean variety television program

== Business and finance ==
=== Companies ===
- Récoltant-Manipulant, a designation for champagne producers with their own label
- Reichle & De-Massari (R&M), a Swiss family tech business
- RM, a clothing line by Roland Mouret
- RM Education, a British computer firm
- RM Sotheby's, a classic car auctioneers

=== Currencies ===
- Malaysian ringgit, Malaysia (ISO 4217: MYR)
- Reichsmark (ℛℳ), German currency during the Weimar Republic and the Third Reich

=== Methods and disciplines ===
- Rapid manufacturing, computer-automated additive manufacturing method
- Records management, an information archiving practice
- Relationship marketing, in marketing jargon
- Revenue management, a discipline aimed at maximize profit for businesses
- Risk management, identification and prioritization of business risks

== Military ==
- Radioman, a rating for the United States Navy
- Regia Marina, the Italian Navy prior to 1946
- Royal Marines, the United Kingdom's amphibious forces

== Places ==
=== Countries ===
- Madagascar, per the UN Conventions on Road Traffic
- Marshall Islands, per the American FIPS 10-4 standard
- Moldova, an abbreviation of its official Romanian name Republica Moldova; also per the World Meteorological Organisation
- Republic of Macedonia (now North Macedonia)
- Romania, per the Library of Congress

=== Forms of place ===
- Ranch to Market Road, a designation for minor state highways in Texas, US
- Rural municipality, a type of district in Canada

=== Locations in the United States ===
- Richard Montgomery High School, Rockville, Maryland
- Richmond, Virginia
- Rocky Mount, North Carolina

=== Regions ===
- Metropolitan City of Rome Capital, Italy (ISO 3166-2:IT code)
  - Province of Rome, Italy
- RM postal area, the UK postcode area for Romford
- Santiago Metropolitan Region of Chile (Spanish: Región Metropolitana de Santiago)

== Science and technology ==
=== Biology and medicine ===
- Range of motion, or range of movement, the distance a joint can move between the flexed and extended positions
- Recurrent miscarriage, referring to multiple consecutive miscarriages
- Regenerative medicine, the process of replacing or regenerating human cells, tissues or organs to restore or establish normal function
- Relative migration, in gel electrophoresis
- Respiratory mechanics, the branch of human physiology focusing upon the bio-mechanics of respiration
- Rhabdomyolysis, a condition in which damaged skeletal muscle tissue breaks down, potentially leading to kidney failure
- Rhesus monkey, a species of Old World monkey native to South, Central and Southeast Asia
- Rhinitis medicamentosa, or rebound congestion
- Urinalysis, or "routine and microscopy", an array of tests performed on urine

=== Computing ===
- RealMedia, a data format provided by RealNetworks
- Relational model, a database model based on predicate logic and set theory
- Reset Mode (ANSI), an ANSI X3.64 escape sequence
- Resource Management, a service in Asynchronous Transfer Mode (ATM) networks
- Reuters Messaging, an instant messenger application
- rm (Unix), a Unix command for the removal of files

=== Physics ===
- Faraday rotation measure, in astrophysics
- Magnetic Reynolds number, a ratio used in magnetohydrodynamics
- Molière radius (Rm), in high energy physics

=== Vehicles ===
- AEC Routemaster, the traditional London bus
- China Railways RM, a Chinese steam locomotive
- Rail Motor, a self-propelled rail car
- SJ Rm, a Swedish locomotive

== Sport ==
- One rep maximum, or 1RM, a weight training term
- Real Madrid C.F., a Spanish football club
- Right midfielder, a position in association football

== Titles ==
- Radioman, a former rate of the U.S. Navy
- Raksha Mantri, the defense minister of India
- Registered Midwife, a legally registered or certified professional midwife
- Reiki Master, one level of the three-tiered hierarchy of Reiki
- Resident magistrate
- Returned Missionary, a Mormon who has served as a missionary

== Other uses ==
- Reasoning Mind, an American school math initiative
- Récoltant-Manipulant, champagne made by the winegrower
- Research Memo, a type of Congressional Research Service Report
- Romansh language, spoken in Switzerland (ISO 639-1 code: rm)
- Rosmah Mansor, wife of Malaysia Prime Minister Dato' Seri Najib Razak

== See also ==
- Regional municipality
- MR (disambiguation)
