= Research Council for Automobile Repairs =

RCAR ( formerly Research Council for Automobile Repairs)
- Abbreviation: RCAR
- Formation: 1972; 54 years ago
- Region served: Worldwide
- Members: 22 research institutes
- Secretary General: Christoph Lauterwasser
- Website: www.rcar.org
- Formerly called: Research Committee for Automobile Repairs / Research Council for Automobile Repairs

RCAR is an international body of insurance industry financed automotive research centres, whose objective is to 'reduce the human and economic costs of motor vehicle losses'. The primary activity of RCAR is concerned with the engineering aspects of collision repairs and training requirements associated with motor vehicles. RCAR was formed in 1972, although the company Folksam that was most influential in the founding of RCAR was involved in repair research activities since 1960.

== Members ==
As of January 2025, RCAR has 22 members spread over 18 countries. They are, in order of joining:

- AZT Automotive GmbH (Germany) - Member since 1972
- Bilskadekomiteen (Norway) - Member since 1972
- Folksam (Sweden) - Member since 1972
- THATCHAM (UK) - Member since 1972
- LVK (Finland) - Member since 1974
- The Jiken Center (Japan) - Member since 1978
- IAG Research Centre (Australia) - Member since 1981
- CESVIMAP (Spain) - Member since 1985
- GENERALICAR (Italy) - Member since 1986
- CENTRO ZARAGOZA (Spain) - Member since 1990
- KTI (Germany) - Member since 1991
- KART (Korea) - Member since 1994
- State Farm Research (USA) - Member since 1995
- CESVI Argentina (Argentina) - Member since 1996
- Insurance Institute for Highway Safety (USA) - Member since 1997
- CESVI Mexico (Mexico) - Member since 1998
- CESVI France (France) - Member since 1999
- CESVI Colombia (Colombia) - Member since 2000
- MRC (Malaysia) - Member since 2004
- AXA Winterthur (Switzerland) - Member since 2005
- Samsung Fire & Marine Insurance, Traffic Safety Research Institute (Korea) Member since 2010
- CIRI Auto Technology Institute (China) - Member since 2016
