= ROV =

- Rov is a concept in Judaism

ROV or Rov may also refer to:

- Rov (river), a 104-km tributary of the Southern Bug, in Ukraine
- Real options valuation, a financial discipline that uses option valuation techniques to analyse capital budgeting decisions
- Realm of Valor, Thai-marketed version of multiplayer online video game Arena of Valor
- Remotely operated vehicle, a free-swimming submersible craft used to remotely perform underwater tasks
- Recreational Off-highway Vehicle, an off-road vehicle also known as a Side-by-side or UTV (Utility Task Vehicle)
- Rostov-on-Don Airport, an airport in southern Russia (former IATA airport code)
- Platov International Airport (IATA airport code)
- Republic of Vietnam, the official name for South Vietnam between 1955 and 1975
