= Return merchandise authorization =

Part of product return process

A return merchandise authorization (RMA), return goods authorization (RGA), or return authorization (RA), is a part of the process of returning a product to receive a refund, replacement, or repair to which buyer and seller agree during the product's warranty period.

== Reverse logistics ==
The issuance of an RMA is a key gatekeeping point in the reverse logistics cycle, providing the vendor with a final opportunity to diagnose and correct the customer's problem with the product. The reasons for a product return vary and include improper installation by the customer or inability to configure the product. RMA comes before the customer permanently relinquishes ownership of the product to the manufacturer, commonly referred to as a return. A return is costly for the vendor and inconvenient for the customer; any return that can be prevented benefits both parties.

Returned merchandise requires management by the manufacturer after the return. The product has a second life cycle after the return. An important aspect of RMA management is learning from RMA trends to prevent further returns. Depending on what the rules are, the manufacturer may send the customer an advance replacement. RMAs may be minimized in a number of ways. Adding a customer survey capability may prevent RMAs by detecting problems in advance of returns.

Returns are sometimes minimized by reducing transaction errors prior to the merchandise leaving the seller. Providing additional information to consumers also reduces returns.

== Return to vendor ==
A return to vendor (RTV) is the process where goods are returned to the original vendor instead of the distributor. In many cases the RTV was originally returned to the seller by the end consumer. While RTV transactions usually occur between the seller and the vendor, in some instances the end consumer returns the product directly to the vendor, sidestepping the distributor.

== See also ==
- Product return
