= Request for waiver =

In a manufacturing environment, a request for waiver (RFW) is a request for authorization to accept an item which, during manufacture or after inspection, is found to depart from specified requirements, but nevertheless is considered suitable for use as is or after repair by an approved method.

In ECSS standard a RFW is defined as "unplanned departure", as opposite to Request for Deviation (RFD) which is defined as "planned departure", being "departure" defined as the "inability of a product to meet one of its functional performance or technical requirements". In both cases, no changes are applied to engineering documentation.

In accordance with MIL-HDBK-61A, the term "waiver" is no longer used, because the processing rules for a RFW are identical to those for a deviation, and the terms deviation and waiver were often confused.

A deviation from the contractual performance requirements or approved drawings should be submitted as a RFD. An RFD is a specific written authorization to depart from a particular requirement of an item's approved configuration documentation for a specific number of units or period of time. A deviation does not change configuration documentation.

Deviations are requested by contractors prior to manufacture, during manufacture, or after an item has been submitted for Customer inspection and acceptance. To be tendered for delivery or to be installed in an item to be tendered for delivery, deviant items must be suitable for use.
