= RFE =

RFE may refer to:

- Radio Free Europe - US government funded broadcasting service targeting the eastern Europe and the former Soviet Union
- Reason for encounter, in medical records
- Request For Evidence, issued by the United States Citizenship and Immigration Services
- Recursive Feature Elimination, a feature selection algorithm in machine learning and statistics
- The Russian Far East
- Rainfall estimates, from the Famine Early Warning Systems Network (FEWS NET)
- Request for enhancement, or change request, in software development
- Road foreman of engines, a railroad occupation
- RFE (market research) (Recency, Frequency, Engagement)
- RFE Phonetic Alphabet, popular for phonetic notation in Spain and Mexico, adopted by the Revista de Filología Española.
