= Registered identification number =

A registered identification number (or RN) is a number issued by the Federal Trade Commission, upon request, to a business residing in the United States that is engaged in the manufacture, importation, distribution, or sale of textile, wool, or fur products.

Such businesses are not required to have RNs. They may, however, use the RN in place of a name on the label or tag that is required to be affixed to their products.

Formerly the Federal Trade Commission issued Wool Products Labeling (WPL) numbers as identification numbers to companies manufacturing wool products. Although new WPL numbers are no longer issued, many are still in use in a similar way as RN numbers.

== See also ==
- Australian Company Number
- CA Identification Number, used in Canada
