= ROH =

Roh or ROH may refer to:

- Roh (film), a 2019 Malaysian horror film
- Roh (name), a given name or surname, including a list of people with the name
- Roh (historical region), in present-day Pakistan and Afghanistan
- Roh, Maré, New Caledonia
- Revoluční odborové hnutí, labour union in Czechoslovakia 1945–1990
- Ring of Honor, American professional wrestling promotion
- Royal Opera House, London, England
- Runs of homozygosity, in DNA sequencing
- Formula of a generic alcohol (substituent R, Oxygen, Hydrogen)
- Romansh language, ISO 639 language code roh
