= Respiratory distress syndrome =

There are two forms of respiratory distress syndrome:

- ARDS, which is acute (or adult) respiratory distress syndrome
- Infant respiratory distress syndrome (IRDS), which is a complication of premature birth, also known as hyaline membrane disease (HMD)

Also, respiratory distress can mean:

- Shortness of breath
- Respiratory failure
