= Air Horizons =

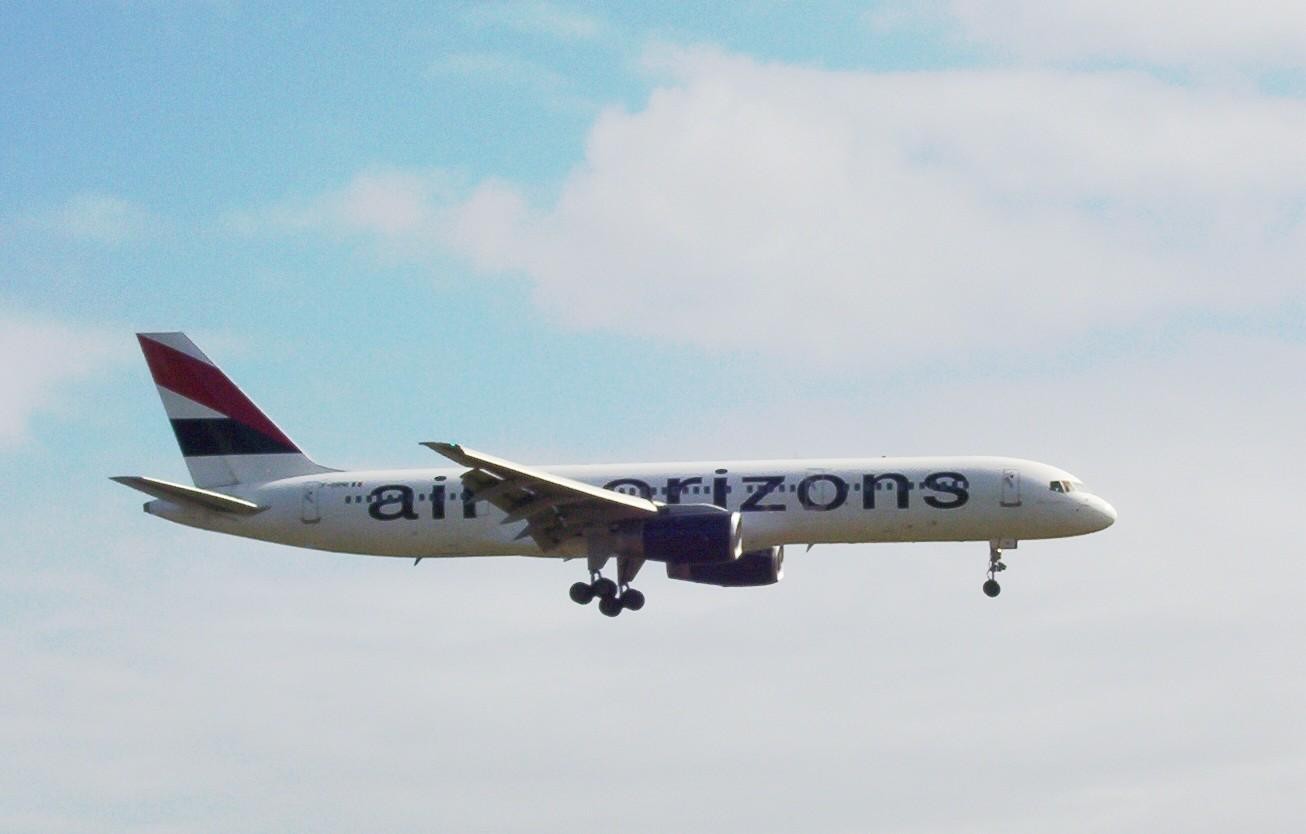
- Boeing 757
IATA	ICAO	Call sign
RN	EUH	Euralair Horizons
- Founded: 1962
- Ceased operations: 2005
- Operating bases: Orly Airport

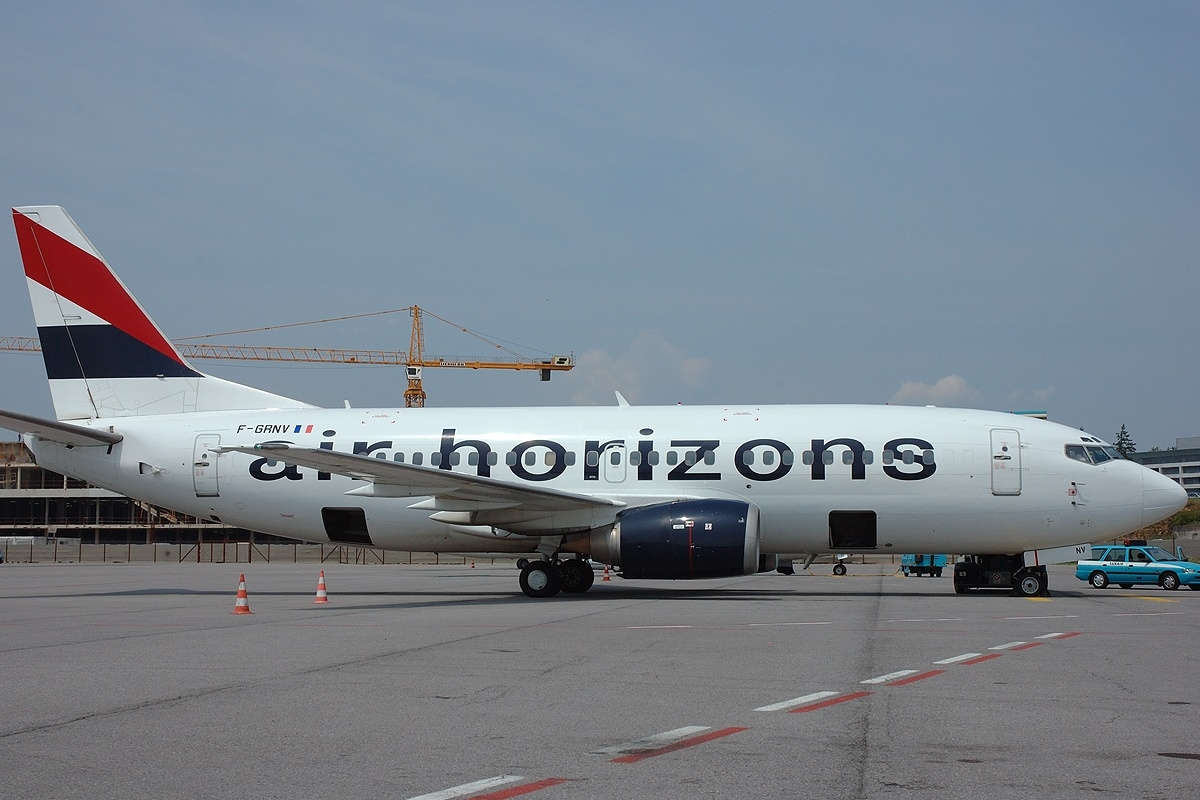
Boeing 737-300

Air Horizons was an airline based in Paris, France. It operated charter flights for tour operators to the Mediterranean and Africa. Its main bases were all three Paris airports, Orly Airport, Charles de Gaulle Airport, and Le Bourget Airport.

== History ==
The airline was established in 2004 using some assets of Euralair, which had been founded in October 1964 by Alexandre Couvelaire. In November 2003 Euralair had to file for bankruptcy protection but was saved from liquidation when it was acquired by Angel Gate Aviation. The corporate name was changed to Air Horizons.

In October 2004 Air Horizons launched weekly scheduled services from Montpellier to Casablanca and from Charles de Gaulle Airport to Ouarzazate. In November 2005, however, the airline went into administration and suspended operations. On the following 7 December it went into liquidation.

== Fleet ==
The fleet was formed by Boeing 737-300, Boeing 737-400, Boeing 737-800 and Boeing 757-200. All these were returned to their lessor after the airline closed.
