= Rotana Media Services =

- Company type: Subsidiary
- Industry: Marketing
- Founded: 2004; 21 years ago in Beirut
- Headquarters: Amman, Jordan
- Products: Advertising services and media services for parent company
- Parent: Rotana Group
- Website: www.rotana.net

Rotana Media Services (RMS or rms) is the Arabic media marketing and advertising wing of Rotana Group established in 2004 and provides advertising services and comprehensive media services to the various radio stations and television channels run by Rotana.

RMS is Rotana’s exclusive advertising agent. RMS is the exclusive advertising agent in charge of selling and promoting all Rotana TV channels, FOX Movies, FOX (Middle East), LBCSAT, Rotana Magazine, and various Rotana radio stations and Rotana TV channels. The division also has outdoor vehicles, interactive media technology outlets and cafés, and can offer movie and music video placements.

== History ==
The company was established as a separate business by Saudi Arabian Rotana Media Group in 2004. The company's head office was initially in Beirut, Lebanon, but decided to move it to Amman, Jordan in March 2009 and has chain of regional offices in Riyadh, Jeddah, Dubai, Cairo, Beirut and Damascus, and through representatives in France (for Europe) and Tunisia, Algeria & Morocco (for North Africa) and Japan.

RMS also announced in 2009 its majority acquisition of Hypermedia, a leading in-store advertising company in the United Arab Emirates.

== RMS Outdoor ==
There is also the outdoor advertising operations run by Rotana Media Services Outdoor better known as RMS Outdoor.
