= RW =

RW or rw may refer to:

== In arts and entertainment ==
- The Real World (TV series), an American reality television show
- Road Wild, a World Championship Wrestling pay-per-view event
- Robbie Williams, a British pop star
- Robin Williams, an American actor
- Roger Waters, British musician
- Robot Wars (disambiguation)

== In mathematics, science and technology ==
=== In computing ===
- Read–write access to files or directories, in file system permissions
- Read–write memory
- Rewritable media
- RenderWare, a 3-D rendering engine produced by Criterion Software

=== Other uses in mathematics, science, and technology ===
- Random walk, a mathematical process that can be used to explain phenomena in several disciplines
- Reaction wheel, a type of flywheel used primarily by spacecraft for attitude control
- Robertson–Walker metric, in cosmology
- RW is the designation for the 15th variable star named in a constellation:
  - RW Cephei, an orange hypergiant located in the constellation Cepheus
  - RW Cygni, a red supergiant located in the constellation Cygnus
  - RW Leonis Minoris, a carbon star located in the constellation Leo Minor
  - RW Ursae Minoris, a recurrent nova located in the constellation Ursa Minor
- A right of way may be referred to in civil engineering and drafting contexts as R/W or RW

== Other uses ==
- Racewalking
- Real world, another term for reality in several contexts
  - For other uses of "real world" see Real world (disambiguation)
- Respondent witness, in law
- Right-wing, one of the winger positions in sport
- Right-wing politics
- Rosewood, a type of wood used for guitar fingerboards
- Rukun warga, an administrative division of Indonesia
- Rwanda (ISO 3166-1 alpha-2 country code)
  - .rw, country code top level domain (ccTLD) for Rwanda
  - Kinyarwanda, a language in Rwanda (ISO 639 alpha-2 code)
- Republic Airlines (IATA airline designator)
- Royal Wings, a Jordanian airline
- Remote work
