= RS =

RS may refer to:

== Businesses and organizations ==
- RS Group, entertainment & media company in Thailand
- RS Group plc, British electronics & industrial distributor in England with brands including RS Components and RS Americas, Inc
- RS Infotainment, Indian film production and distribution company
- RS Productions, defunct Australian television and radio production company
- Ranvir Sena, Indian upper-caste landlord militia
- Relief Society, an official auxiliary of The Church of Jesus Christ of Latter-day Saints (LDS)
- République solidaire, a French political party
- Roberval and Saguenay Railway (reporting mark RS)
- Royal Society, the United Kingdom's national academy of sciences
- Russian Party (Serbia) (Ruska stranka), a political party in Serbia

=== Sport ===
- RS Sailing, an international designer and builder of sailboats and dinghies
- Queens Park Rangers F.C., a professional football club from Shepherd's Bush, London, commonly nicknamed 'The Rs'

== Places ==
- Republic of Serbia (ISO 3166-1 code RS), country
- Republic of Slovenia, country
- Republika Srpska, one of the two political entities that compose the state of Bosnia and Herzegovina
- Republika Srpska (1992–1995)
- Rio Grande do Sul (ISO 3166-2 code BR-RS), Brazilian state

== Science and technology ==
- R/S classification, of the chirality of a molecule
- RS, a class of racemic mixture
- Radio Science, an instrument aboard MESSENGER space probe
- Remote sensing
- Risk and Safety Statements (R/S statements), a system of hazard codes and phrases for labeling dangerous chemicals

=== Biology and medicine ===
- Resistant starch, indigestible starches (and sugars from starches)
- Roemheld syndrome, a complex of gastrocardiac symptoms
- Stomatal resistance (r_{s}), of leaves
- rs, prefix of a DbSNP record ID number e.g. rs206437
- Respiratory syncytial virus, a species of virus

=== Computing ===
- .rs, the internet country code top-level domain for Republic of Serbia
- .rs, a filename extension for Rust source code
- Recommended Standard (EIA), e.g. RS-232
- Record Separator, in the C0 control code
- Reed–Solomon error correction

== Vehicles ==
- Rally Sport, a designation applied to rallying cars
- Rennsport (German for "racing sport"), a designation used for cars such as the Audi RS models
  - Porsche 911 Carrera RS
  - Porsche 911 GT3 RS
- Ford Team RS, Ford Motor Company's European performance car and motorsport division
- Renault Sport (R.S.), performance and motorsport division of automobile manufacturer Renault

== Other uses ==
- Rupee sign - Rs is used to denote currencies named rupee.
- Pakistani rupee (plural currency symbol Rs)
- RS (rapper) (2000–2019), Dutch drill rapper
- Report Short, a type of US Congressional Research Service Report
- Regular Show, a Cartoon Network animated TV series.
- Retail services specialist, an occupational rating in the U.S. Navy
- Rolling Stone magazine
- RuneScape, a fantasy MMORPG by Jagex
- Reality shifting, a cognitive activity in which practitioners fantasize themselves into alternate realities through meditation and focus
