= Roe (disambiguation) =

Roe or hard roe, is the fully ripe egg masses of fish and certain marine invertebrates.

Roe or ROE may also refer to:

== Places ==
=== Australia ===
- Electoral district of Roe, Western Australia
- Roe Botanical District or Mallee, a biogeographic region in southern Western Australia
- Roe Plains, Western Australia, a coastal plain
- Roe River (Western Australia)

=== United Kingdom ===
- Roe Beck, Cumbria, England, also known as the River Roe in its lower reaches
- River Roe, County Londonderry, Northern Ireland

=== United States ===
- Roe, Arkansas, a town
- Roe River, Montana
- Roes Spring, a stream in Georgia

== People ==
- Roe (surname)
- Roe (given name)
- R.O.E., an American singer and rapper from Chicago

== Games ==
- Ring of Elysium (RoE), a 2018 battle royale video game developed by Tencent Games
- Rise of the Eldrazi (ROE), a Magic: The Gathering expansion
- Rubies of Eventide (ROE), a defunct massively multiplayer online role-playing game

== Military ==
- Rules of engagement, the internal rules or directives among military forces
- USS Roe (DD-24), a modified Paulding-class destroyer launched in 1909
- USS Roe (DD-418), a Sims-class destroyer launched in 1939

== Transport ==
- Roe (ship), two slave ships
- Roe Highway, a highway in the suburbs of Perth, Western Australia
- Rosedale railway station, Australia
- Rotherhithe railway station, London, National Rail station code

== Other uses ==
- Roe deer
- Roe v. Wade, a landmark 1973 United States Supreme Court decision on the issue of abortion
  - Norma McCorvey, plaintiff known pseudonymously as "Jane Roe"
- Return on equity or ROE, the rate of return for ownership interest of common stock owners
- Royal Observatory, Edinburgh or ROE, Scotland, UK
- Charles H. Roe, a British coachbuilding company
- "Roe", a season 5 episode of Boston Legal
- Reach on error (ROE), a baseball statistic

== See also ==
- Pseudonyms for parties whose true identity is unknown or must be withheld in a legal matter:
  - Jane Roe (pseudonym)
  - Richard Roe (pseudonym)
- Roes, a townland in Inver, County Donegal, Ireland
- Row (disambiguation)
- Rowe (disambiguation)
