= Row =

Row or ROW may refer to:

== Exercise ==
- Rowing, or a form of aquatic movement using oars
- Row (weight-lifting), a form of weight-lifting exercise

== Mathematics and informatics ==
- Row vector, a 1 × n matrix in linear algebra
- Row(s) in a table (information), a data arrangement with rows and columns
- Row (database), a single, implicitly structured data item in a database table
- Tone row, an arrangement of the twelve notes of the chromatic scale

== Places ==
- Rów, Pomeranian Voivodeship, north Poland
- Rów, Warmian-Masurian Voivodeship, north Poland
- Rów, West Pomeranian Voivodeship, northwest Poland
- Roswell International Air Center's IATA code
- Row, a former spelling of Rhu, Dunbartonshire, Scotland
- The Row (Lyme, New York), a set of historic homes
- The Row, Virginia, an unincorporated community
- Rest of the world (RoW)
- The Row or The Row Fulton Market, 900 West Randolph, a Chicago Skyscraper on Chicago's Restaurant Row

== Other ==
- Reality of Wrestling, an American professional wrestling promotion founded in 2005
- Row (album), an album by Gerard
- Row (film), a British thriller film
- Right-of-way (transportation), ROW, also often R/O/W
- The Row (fashion label)
- The Row, a 2018 Canadian-American film with Randy Couture
- The Row (film), a 2026 documentary film
- Regulation plus Overtime Wins, an ice hockey statistic used by the National Hockey League to break ties between teams that are equal on points; see Ice hockey statistics § Team statistics

== See also ==
- Skid row (disambiguation)
- Rowing (disambiguation)
- Rowe (disambiguation)
- Roe (disambiguation)
- Rho (disambiguation)
- Line (disambiguation)
- Column (disambiguation)
- Controversy
