= Rowe =

Rowe may refer to:

== Places ==
- Rowe, Massachusetts, U.S.
- Rowe, New Mexico, U.S.
- Rowes Bay, Queensland, a suburb of Townsville Australia
- Rowe, now Rówek, Poland

== Other ==
- Rowe (surname)
- Rowe (musician), solo project of Becky Louise Filip, former member of The Honey Trees
- ROWE, Results-Only Work Environment
- USS Rowe (DD-564), naval destroyer
- Rowe Mineralölwerk, a German lubricant manufacturer and sponsor of Rowe Racing
- Rowe Racing, a German auto racing team

== See also ==
- ROWE
- Mount Rowe, a small mountain in New Hampshire
- Row (disambiguation)
- Roe (disambiguation)
- Wroe (disambiguation)
