= Piece work =

Payment of wages per unit of output

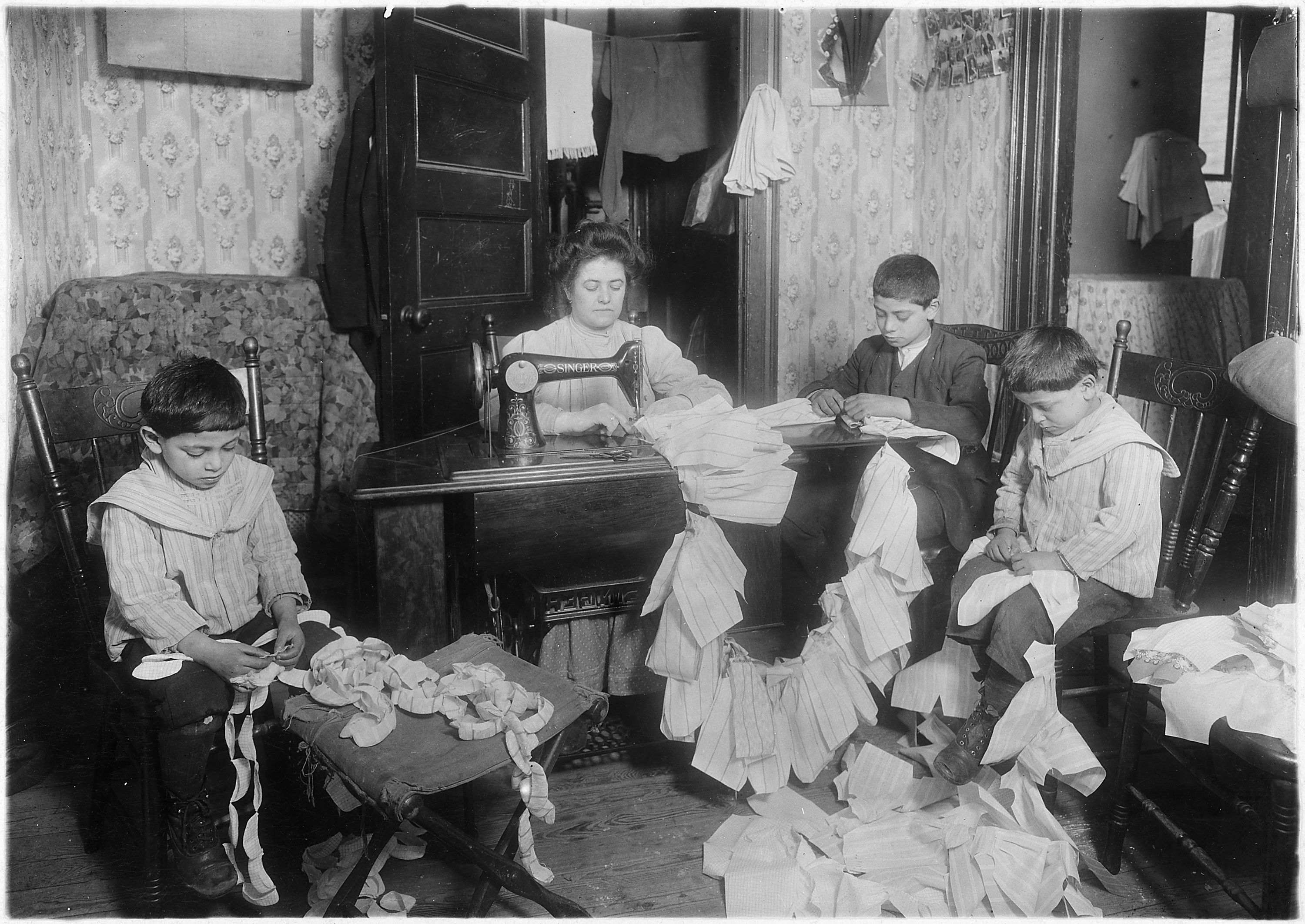
A family in New York City making dolls' clothes by piecework in 1912

Piece work or piecework is any type of employment in which a worker is paid a fixed piece rate for each unit produced or action performed, regardless of the time taken to do so.

Some industries where piece rate pay jobs are common are agricultural work, cable installation, call centers, writing, editing, translation, truck driving, data entry, carpet cleaning, craftwork, garment production, and manufacturing.

== Payment ==
When paying a worker, employers can use various methods and combinations of methods. Some of the most prevalent methods are: wage by the hour (known as "time work"); annual salary; salary plus commission (common in sales jobs); base salary or hourly wages plus gratuities (common in service industries); salary plus a possible bonus (used for some managerial or executive positions); salary plus stock options (used for some executives and in start-ups and some high tech firms); salary pool systems; gainsharing (also known as "profit sharing"); and being paid by the piece – the number of things they make, or tasks they complete (known as "output work").

Working for a piece rate does not mean that employers are exempt from paying minimum wage or overtime requirements, which vary among jurisdictions.

Employers may find it in their interest to use piece rate pay after examining three theoretical considerations; the cost and viability of monitoring output in a way that accurately measures production so that quality does not decrease is first. Variable skill level is second, where piece rates are more effective in a more homogenous workforce. Thirdly, there may be more invasive managerial relations as management attempts to test how fast the workers can produce.

Employees decide whether to work for piece rate pay if the relative earnings are high, and if other physical and psychological conditions are favorable. Some of these might be job stress, physicality, risks, degree of supervision and ability to work with peers or family members. Employees may also be more or less welcoming to performance pay depending on the leverage and risk. Leverage was defined as ratio of variable pay to base pay, and risk is the probability the employee will see increased benefits with effort. Workers tended to be suspicious of pay packages that were too heavy on variable pay and were concerned it might be a concession to remove cost-of-living wage adjustments or to secure wage rollbacks.

== Establishing a fair rate ==
Under UK law, piece workers must be paid either at least the minimum wage for every hour worked or on the basis of a ‘fair rate’ for each task or piece of work they do. Output work can only be used in limited situations when the employer doesn't know which hours the worker does (e.g. some home workers). If an employer sets the working hours and the workers have to clock in and out, this counts as time work, not as output work.

The fair rate is the amount that allows an average worker to be paid the minimum wage per hour if they work at an average rate. This must be calculated in a set way, a control trial is run to determine the average items produced by equivalent workers, this is divided by 1.2 to reach the agreed average figure, and the fair rate is set to ensure each worker achieves the minimum wage. (Note: Example: Workers are paid for each shirt they make. They can produce on average 12 shirts per hour. This number is divided by 1.2 to make 10. Andy is 21 and is eligible for the minimum wage rate of £6.19. This means he must be paid at least 62p per shirt he makes (£6.19 divided by 10, rounded up).)

There are several software programs that determine the time that a trained operator should take to perform an operation. These make unit estimations based on the individual motions that an operator is required to make to complete a task. In a service setting, the output of piece work can be measured by the number of operations completed, as when a telemarketer is paid by the number of calls made or completed, regardless of the outcome of the calls (pay for only certain positive outcomes is more likely to be called a sales commission or incentive pay). Crowdsourcing systems such as Mechanical Turk involve minute information-processing tasks (such as identifying photos or recognizing signatures) for which workers are compensated on a per-task basis.

== History ==
=== Guild system ===
As a term and as a common form of labor, 'piece work' had its origins in the guild system of work during the Commercial Revolution and before the Industrial Revolution. Since the phrase 'piece work' first appears in writing around the year 1549, it is likely that at about this time, the master craftsmen of the guild system began to assign their apprentices work on pieces which could be performed at home, rather than within the master's workshop. In the British factory system, workers mass-produced parts from a fixed design as part of a division of labor, but did not have the advantage of machine tools or metalworking jigs. Simply counting the number of pieces produced by a worker was likely easier than accounting for that worker's time, as would have been required for the computation of an hourly wage.

=== Industrial Revolution ===
Piece work took on new importance with the advent of machine tools, such as the machine lathe in 1751. Machine tools made possible by the American system of manufacturing (attributed to Eli Whitney) in 1799 in which workers could truly make just a single part but make many copies of it for later assembly by others. The reality of the earlier English system had been that handcrafted pieces rarely fit together on the first try, and a single artisan was ultimately required to rework all parts of a finished good. By the early 19th century, the accuracy of machine tools meant that piecework parts were produced fully ready for final assembly.

Frederick Winslow Taylor was one of the main champions of the piece rate system in the late 19th century. Although there were many piece rate systems in use, they were largely resented and manipulative. One of the most influential tenets of Scientific Management was Taylor's popularization of the "differential piece rate system", which relied on accurate measurements of productivity rates to create a "standard" production output target. Those who were not able to meet the target suffered a penalty and were likely fired. Taylor spread that in published papers in 1895, and the timed piece rate system gave birth to creating modern cost control and, as a result, modern corporate organization.

== Criticism ==
In the mid-19th century, the practice of distributing garment assembly among lower-skilled and lower-paid workers came to be known in Britain as the sweating system and arose at about the same time that a practical (foot-powered) sewing machine, was developed. Factories that collected sweating system workers at a single location, working at individual machines, and being paid piece rates became pejoratively known as sweatshops.

There can be improper record keeping at the hands of supervisors attempting to cheat employees, to build piece rate systems that prevent workers from earning higher wages. That is often at the cost of both the worker and the enterprise, however, as the quality and the sustainability of the business will be threatened by decreases in quality or productivity of workers attempting to stay afloat. Put another way, if the payment for producing a well-made item is not enough to support a worker, workers will need to work faster, produce more items per hour, and sacrifice quality.

Today, piece work and sweatshops remain closely linked conceptually even though each has continued to develop separately. The label "sweatshop" now refers more to long hours, poor working conditions, and low pay even if they pay an hourly or daily wage labour, instead of a piece rate.

== Legal status ==
=== United States minimum wage ===
In the United States, the Fair Labor Standards Act requires that all employees, including piece work employees, earn at least the minimum wage. In calculating an appropriate piece work rate, employers must keep track of average productivity rates for specific activities and set a piece work rate that ensures that all workers are able to earn minimum wage. If a worker earns less than the minimum wage, the employer has to pay the difference. Exceptions to this rule include instances where: (i) the worker is a family member of the employer; (ii) if in any calendar quarter of the preceding year there were fewer than 500 person-days of work lasting at least one hour; (iii) in agricultural businesses, if a worker primarily takes care of livestock on the range; (iv) if non-local hand-harvesting workers are under 16, are employed on the same farm as their parent, and receive the piece work rate for those over 16.

=== California garment industry ban ===
The Garment Worker Protection Act banned piece work in the garment industry, effective January 1, 2022. The same law made fashion brands liable for any resulting fines. As of 2025, the law is evaded by some employers using fake time clocks, coaching workers how to lie to state investigators, and closing factories to avoid fines and back pay.

== Advantages of piece rate pay ==
Incentivizes productivity: piece rate pay encourages workers to increase their output as they directly benefit from producing more.

Flexibility: piece rate pay can offer flexibility to workers as they can often choose their own hours and work at their own pace, especially in jobs such as freelance writing or data entry.

Potential for higher earnings: skilled workers who are efficient in their tasks can potentially earn more through piece rate pay than through traditional hourly wages.

== Disadvantages of piece rate pay ==
Quality concerns: workers may sacrifice quality for quantity to maximize their earnings, leading to potential issues with the quality of goods or services produced.

Risk of exploitation: some employers may set piece rates unfairly low, leading to workers being underpaid for their labor, especially in industries with low barriers to entry.

Lack of stability: piece rate pay may not provide a stable income, as earnings can fluctuate based on factors such as demand for the product or service and individual productivity levels.

== See also ==
- Gig worker
- Performance-related pay
- Putting-out system
- Piece-rate list
- ROWE
