= Roes =

Roes may refer to:

== People ==
- Alexander of Roes (died after 1288)
- Geoff Roes (born 1976), American ultra-marathon runner
- Georges Roes (1889–1945), French sport shooter
- Michael Roes (born 1960), German writer and filmmaker
- Peter Roes (born 1964), Belgian racing cyclist
- Raykeea Raeen-Roes, also known as Angel Haze (born 1991), American rapper and singer
- Sven Roes (born 1999), Dutch short track speed skater

== Places ==
- Roes, Rhineland-Palatinate, Germany
- Roes Spring, United States
