= Rometsch =

German coachbuilding company

Rometsch logo

Karosserie Friedrich Rometsch was a German metallurgical-coachbuilding company based in Berlin-Halensee, Nestorstrasse 41, that manufactured, modified, and repaired coaches, trailers, bodies and chassis.

== History ==
Founded in 1924 by Friedrich Rometsch, the company was one of many in Europe providing car bodies for customers buying their motor-car in "bare chassis form", complete with an engine, and then employing a coachbuilder to add a custom-built body. By the late 1930s it was becoming more usual to buy the complete vehicle.

Friedrich Rometsch and his son Fritz Rometsch had earned their experience while working for the coachbuilder, Erdmann & Rossi. During the early years most Rometsch car bodies were designed for use as taxis, using mainly Opel chassis. There were also some bespoke bodies produced for private customers. During the Second World War the company switched to manufacturing mobile field kitchens for the army.

Johannes Beeskow, a Rometsch designer who had worked for Erdmann & Rossi during the 1930s, built the first prototype of a four-door sedan in 1950; the donor vehicle being a Volkswagen Beetle in scrap condition. Rometsch took this concept into the production of a taxicab. The wheelbase had been stretched by about 27 centimetres (11 in). Access to the backseats was improved by incorporating suicide doors.

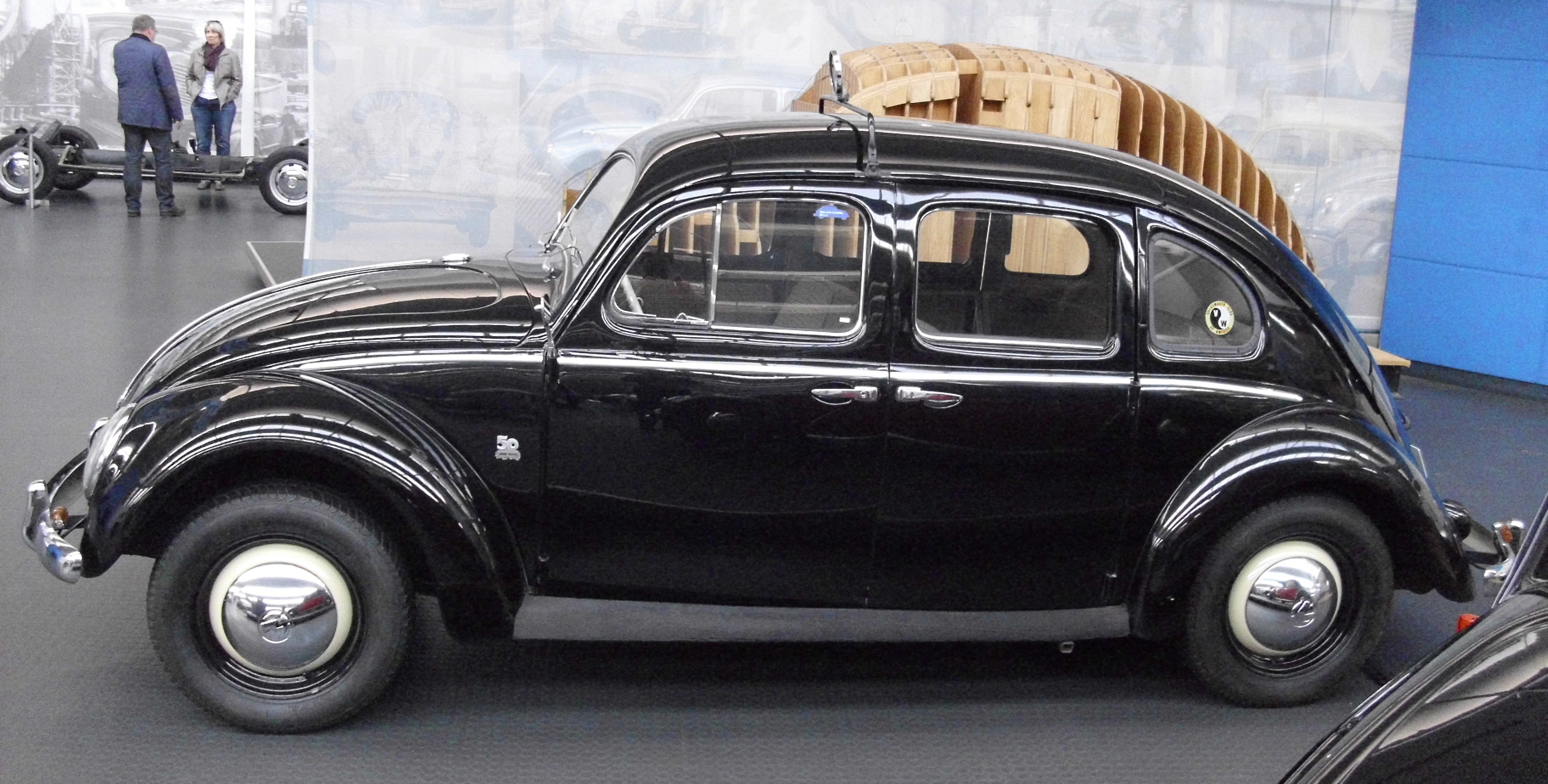
1953 Rometsch Taxi at Wolfsburg AutoMuseum Volkswagen

The Beeskow and the Lawrence were also based on the Volkswagen Beetle, with a Rometsch body. These were named after their designers. Both models were available as a coupé and as a convertible. These vehicles gained awards at the Geneva Automotive Show several times. About 17 examples were built per year.

When sales declined, mainly due to the competition from the mass production of the Type 14 Karmann Ghia, which was 1,500 DEM cheaper and also built on the Beetle chassis, the general director of Volkswagen, Heinrich Nordhoff, stopped the supply to Rometsch. He also prohibited dealers from selling either chassis or vehicles to Rometsch. When Rometsch realised they were selling the Lawrence at a loss, he was forced to cut wages to piece rate.

A further blow hit Rometsch in the summer of 1961 when the construction of the Berlin Wall separated the business from nearly half of its 90 employees overnight. The production of the sports car ended later that year. From 1962 the business was concentrated on car body repairs, specialising in taxis. However, it did carry out a small series of bespoke conversions using Range Rovers, producing at least three lengthened-wheelbase "hunting vehicles" during the mid-1980s for General Secretary Erich Honecker. During its final years Rometsch turned to producing ambulance bodies and customising bus bodies for tour companies, while still also rebuilding damaged vehicles. The company closed in 2000.

At least 200 to 250 customised bodies were manufactured by Rometsch; automotive historian Werner Oswald wrote of a total approaching 500, while the magazine Der Spiegel reported up to 585. Taxi entrepreneurs from Berlin made Rometsch manufacture 38 of the stretched Beetle taxis.

== 1951 Rometsch Beeskow ==
The Beeskow was twice the price of its platform and parts donor, the Volkswagen Beetle. The Beeskow became "the Beetle for the high society". The design of falling lines on head and tail of the pontoon body caused it to be nicknamed "the banana". A third seat was installed behind the driver seat, turned by 90 degrees, facing the nearside. The actor Viktor de Kowa bought the first Beeskow at the Geneva Automotive Show. As Friedrich Rometsch had not thought of a price, he took a look at the Porsche exhibition booth next-door where the Porsche 356 was offered for 10,000 DEM and Rometsch offered the car for 9,800 DEM, which was accepted. Today that price would equal 28385 EUR. Both Gregory Peck and Audrey Hepburn also bought Beeskows.

In the late middle 1950s, the design engineer Johannes Beeskow moved to the Karmann company in Osnabrück as their department manager of technical research. Some of the design elements from the Beeskow were found later in other vehicles such as the so-called "wheelbrows" on the bumpers of the Mercedes-Benz 300 SL and also the roof of the Audi TT. About 175 Beeskows were built, of which the majority were convertibles. The Coupés can be divided into three series, easily identifiable by the size of the rear windshield which grew considerably with each change.

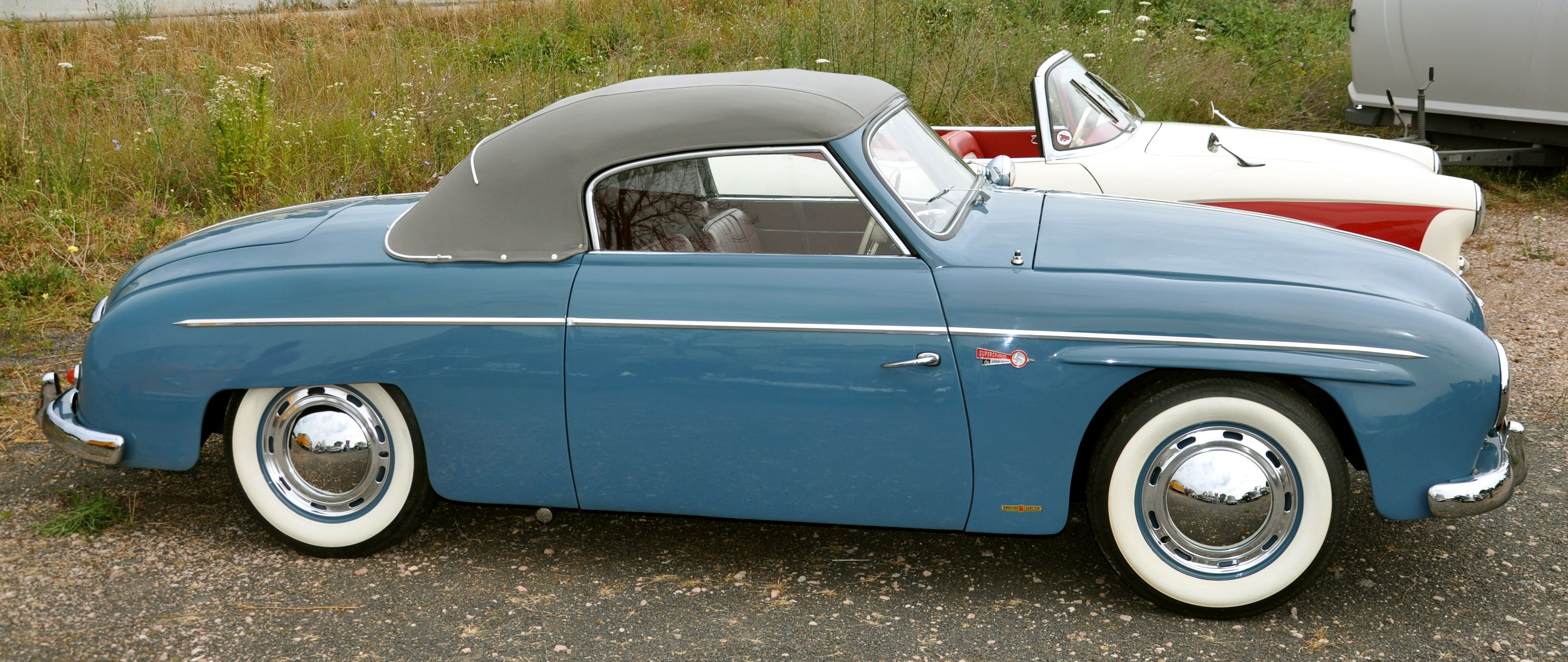
1956 Rometsch Beeskow Convertible

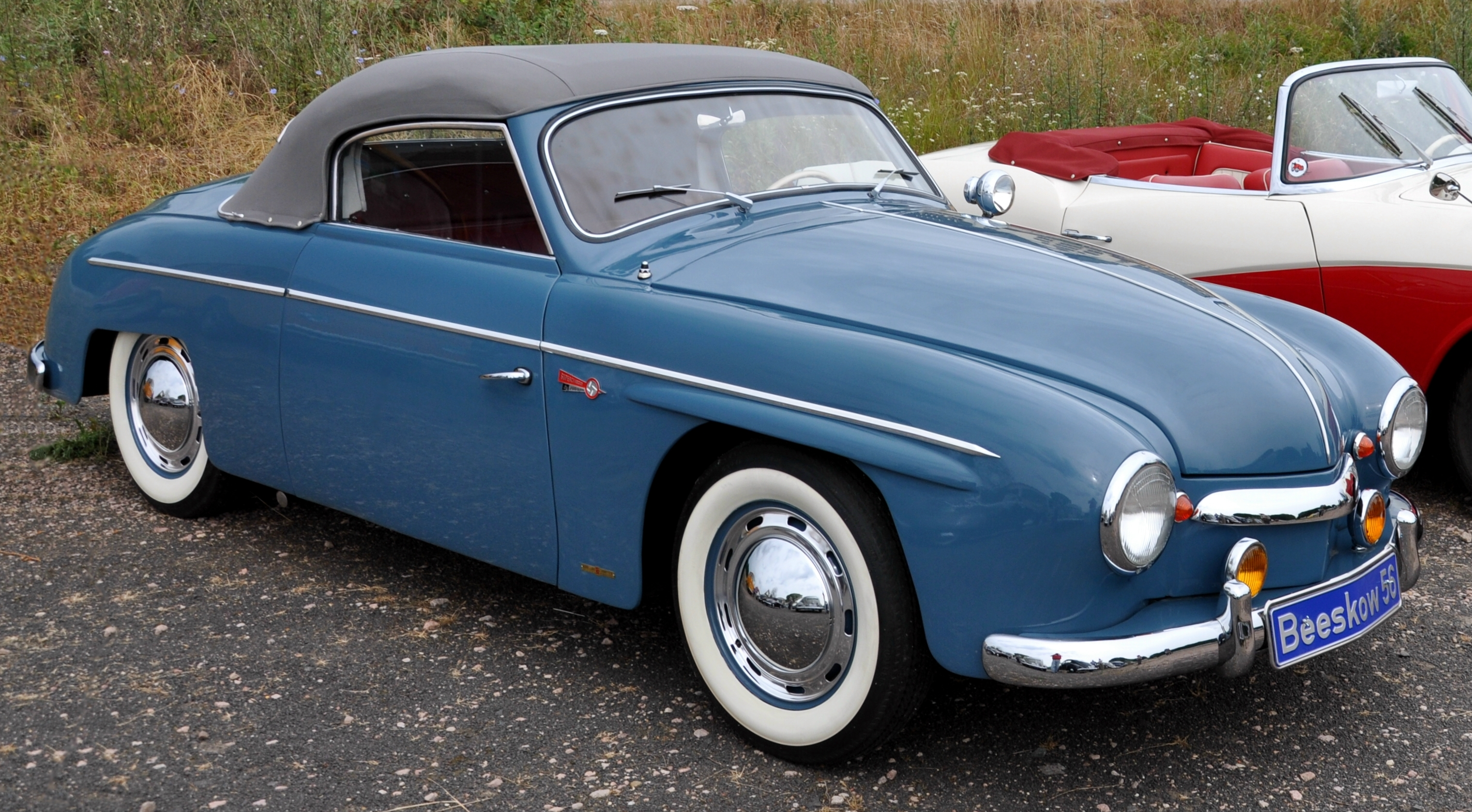

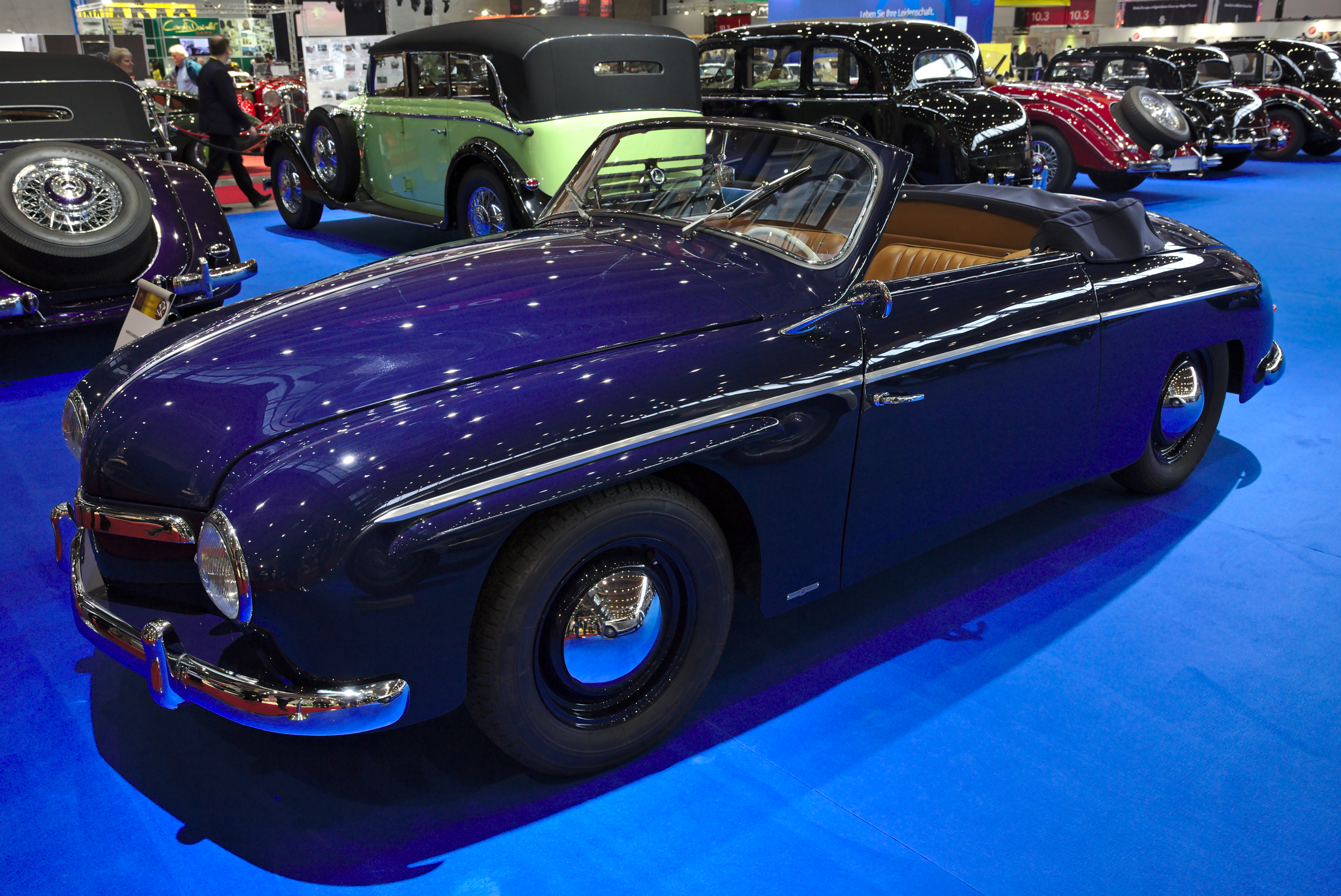
1957 Convertible

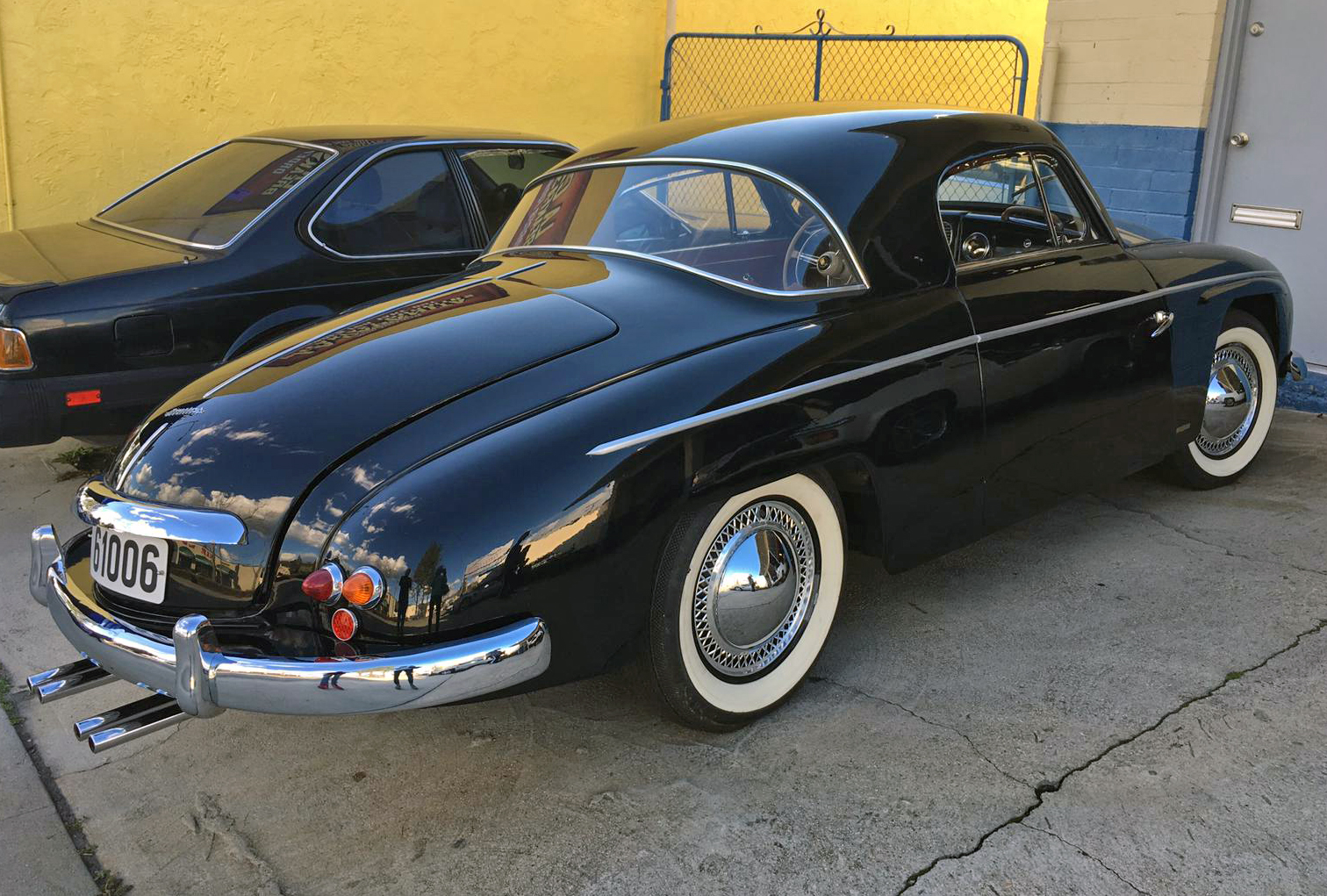
1954 Series 2 Beeskow Coupé, with panoramic rear windshield

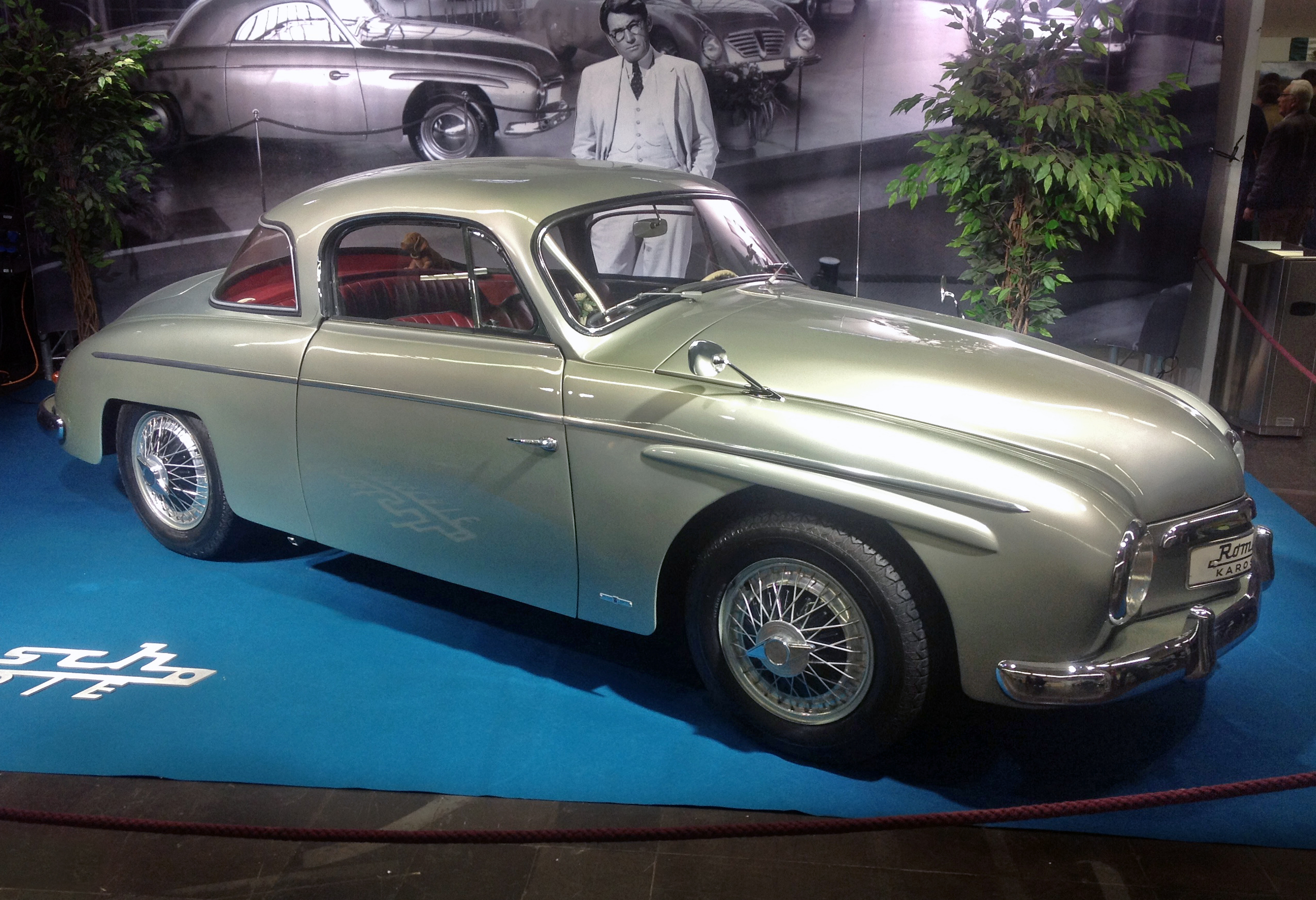
1955 Series 3 Coupé with fully wraparound rear windshield

== 1954 Rometsch Porsche Spyder ==
In early 1954 Rometsch manufactured a light alloy body for a racing car, following the shape of Porsche 550 Spyder, again utilising the Beetle chassis. The gearbox and the 1.1-litre, 68 PS (50 kW) engine which were made by Porsche, gave a topspeed of 190 to 200 km/h (118 to 124 mph).

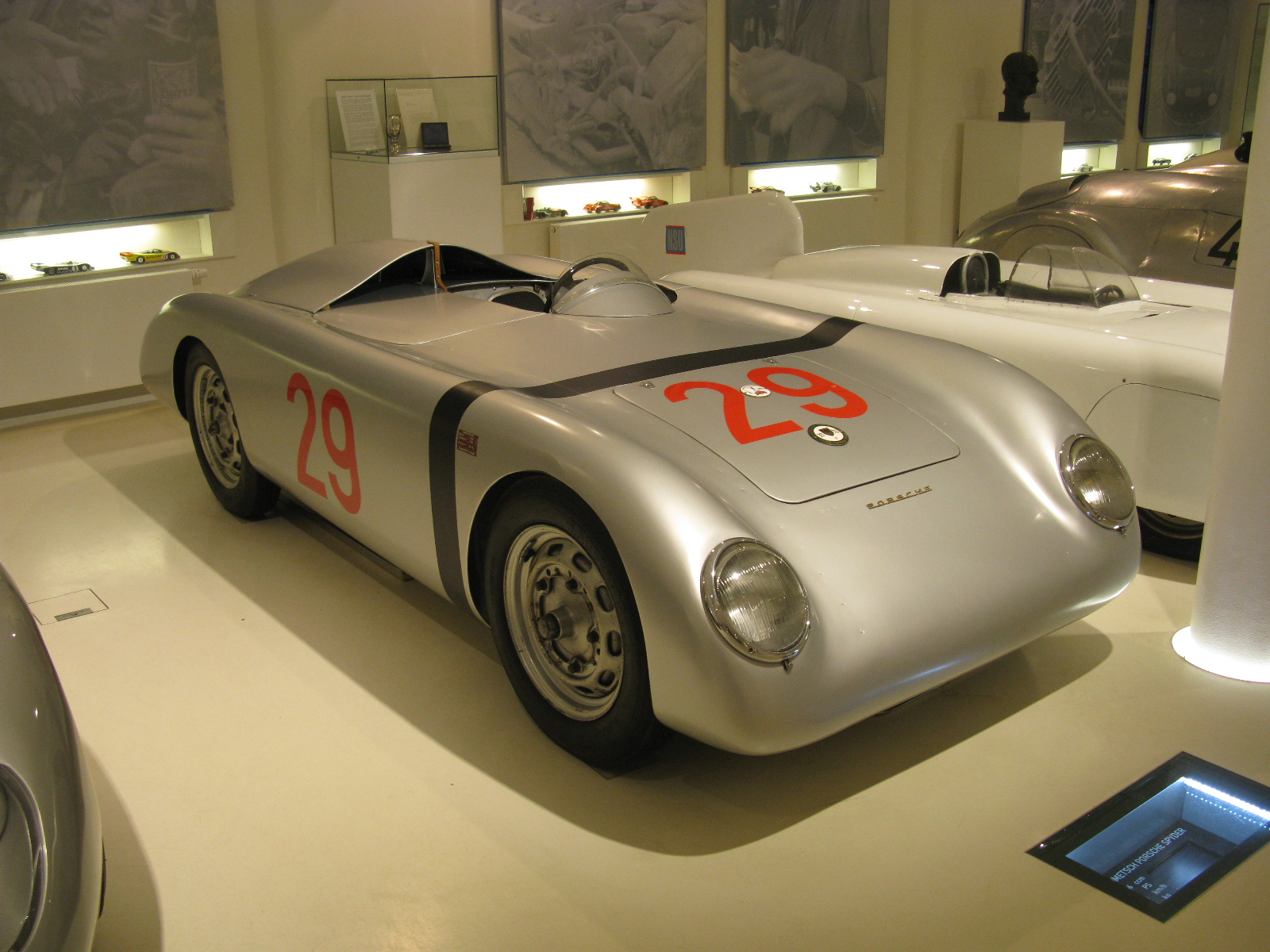

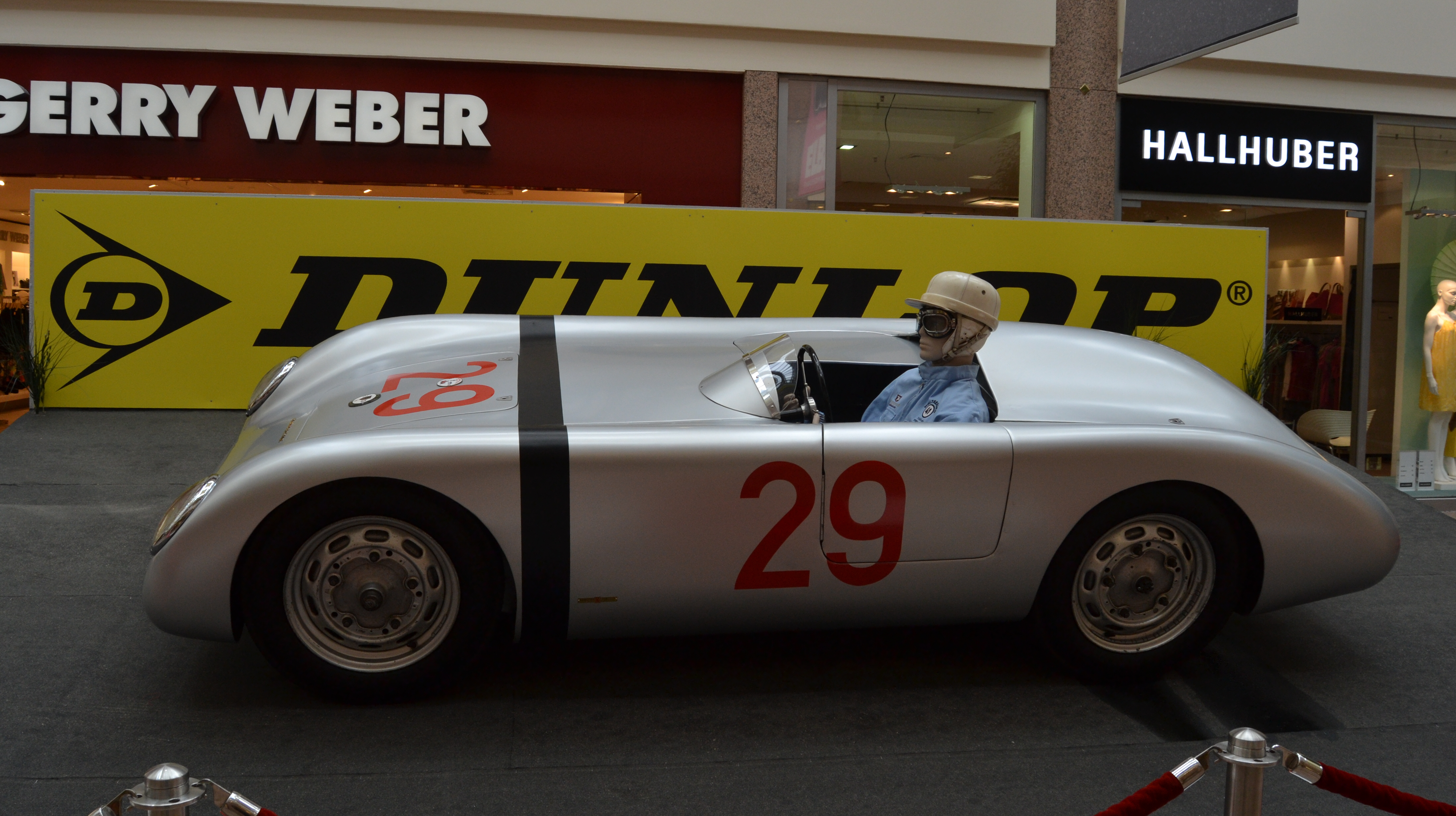

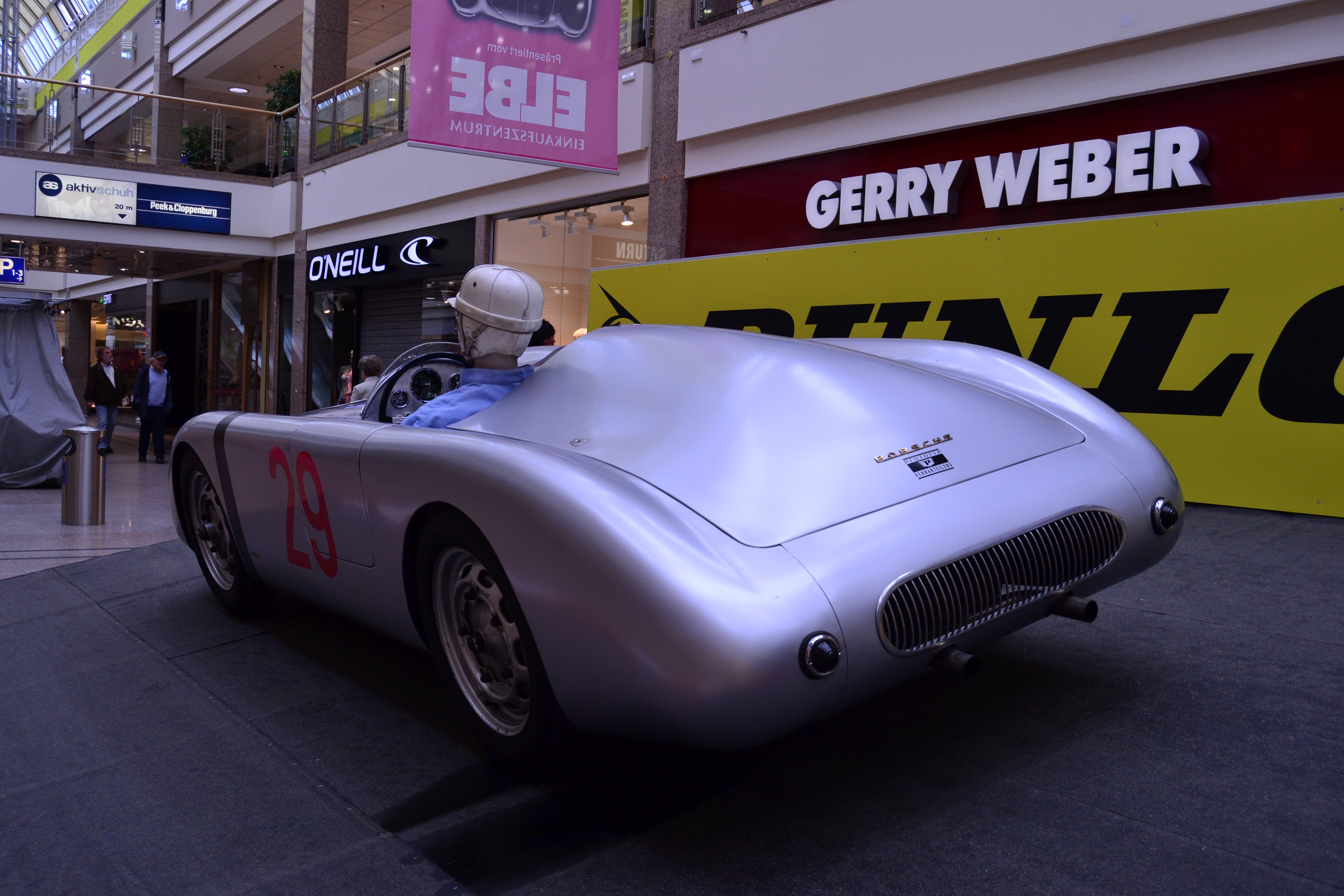
Original 1954 Rometsch Porsche Spyder

== 1957 Rometsch Lawrence ==
The Rometsch Lawrence was introduced in 1957. The furniture designer Bert Lawrence had drawn the shape of the car. Again a modified Beetle with a brand-new body; 15 cm (15 centimetres (5.9 in) inch) lower and a harmonic two-colour appearance. The padded dashboard was uncommon at that time in Germany. A Petri steering wheel was available as an option. Design elements such as American-style tailfins, wrap-around windshield and Italian-styling won the car the "Golden Rose" at the 1957 International Geneva Motor Show. Available as a coupé and a convertible, it took about 1200 hours to build a Lawrence. In 1959 in Germany it sold for 8000 DEM, which equals 19648 EUR today.

Production of the Lawrence ended in 1961. A restored 1959 Rometsch Lawrence is exhibited at the Wolfsburg AutoMuseum Volkswagen.

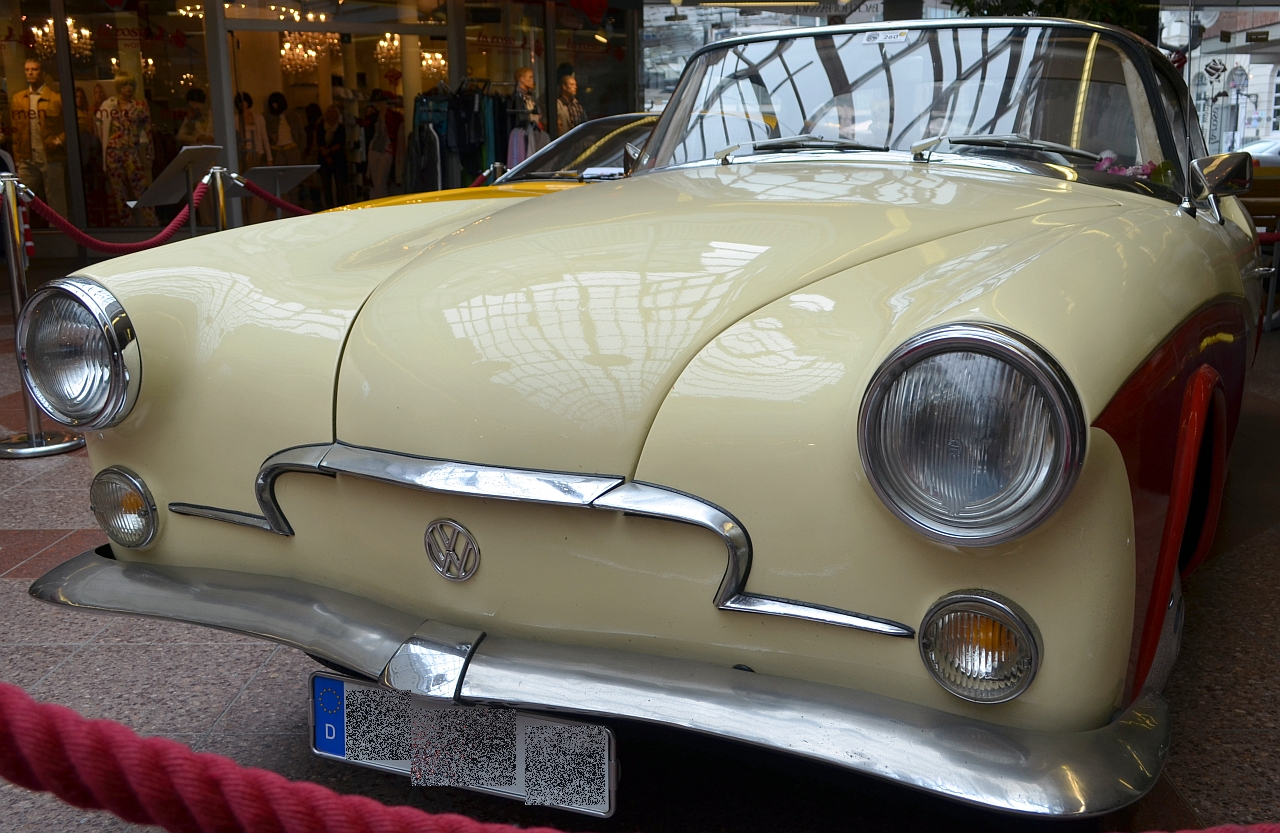

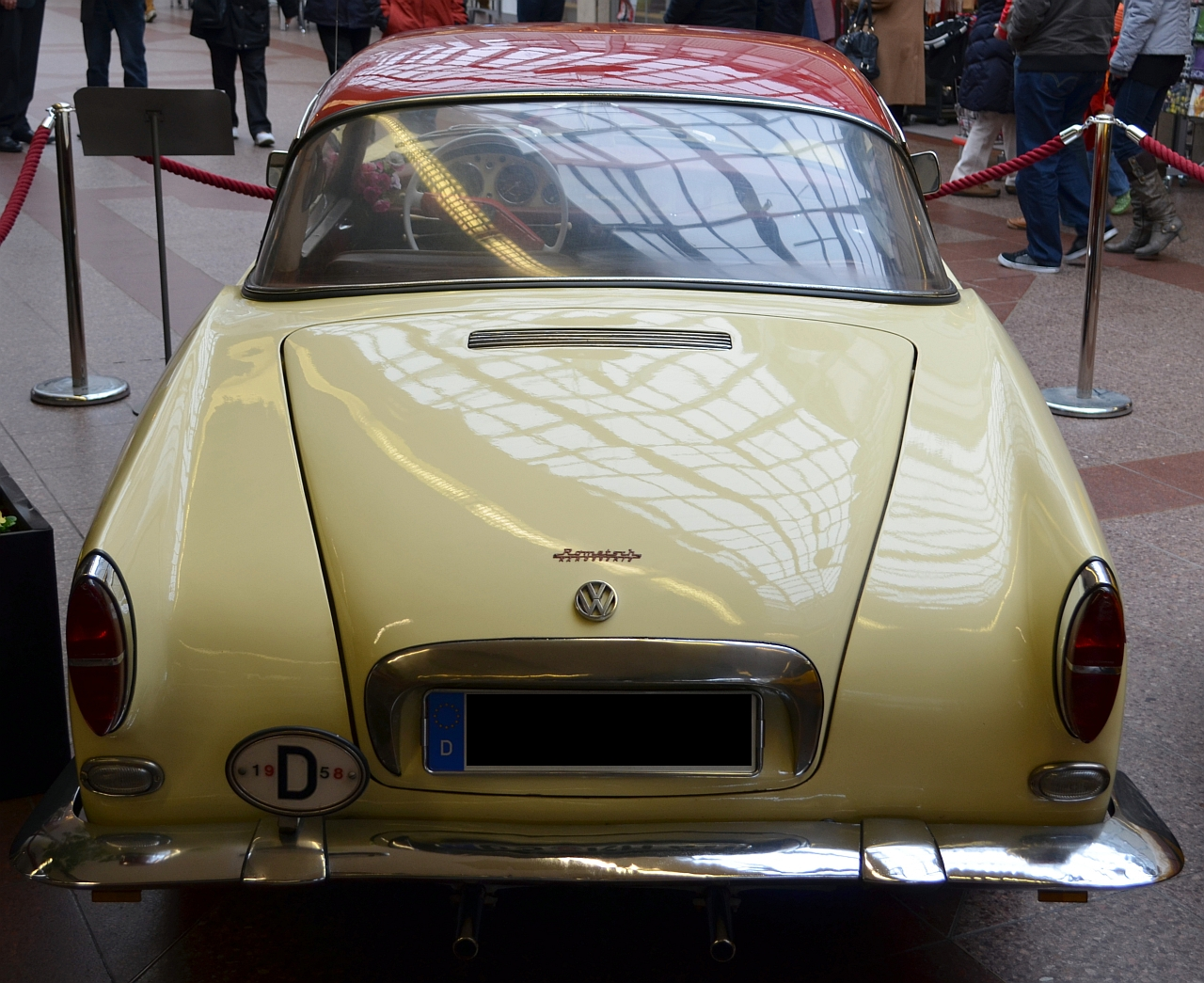

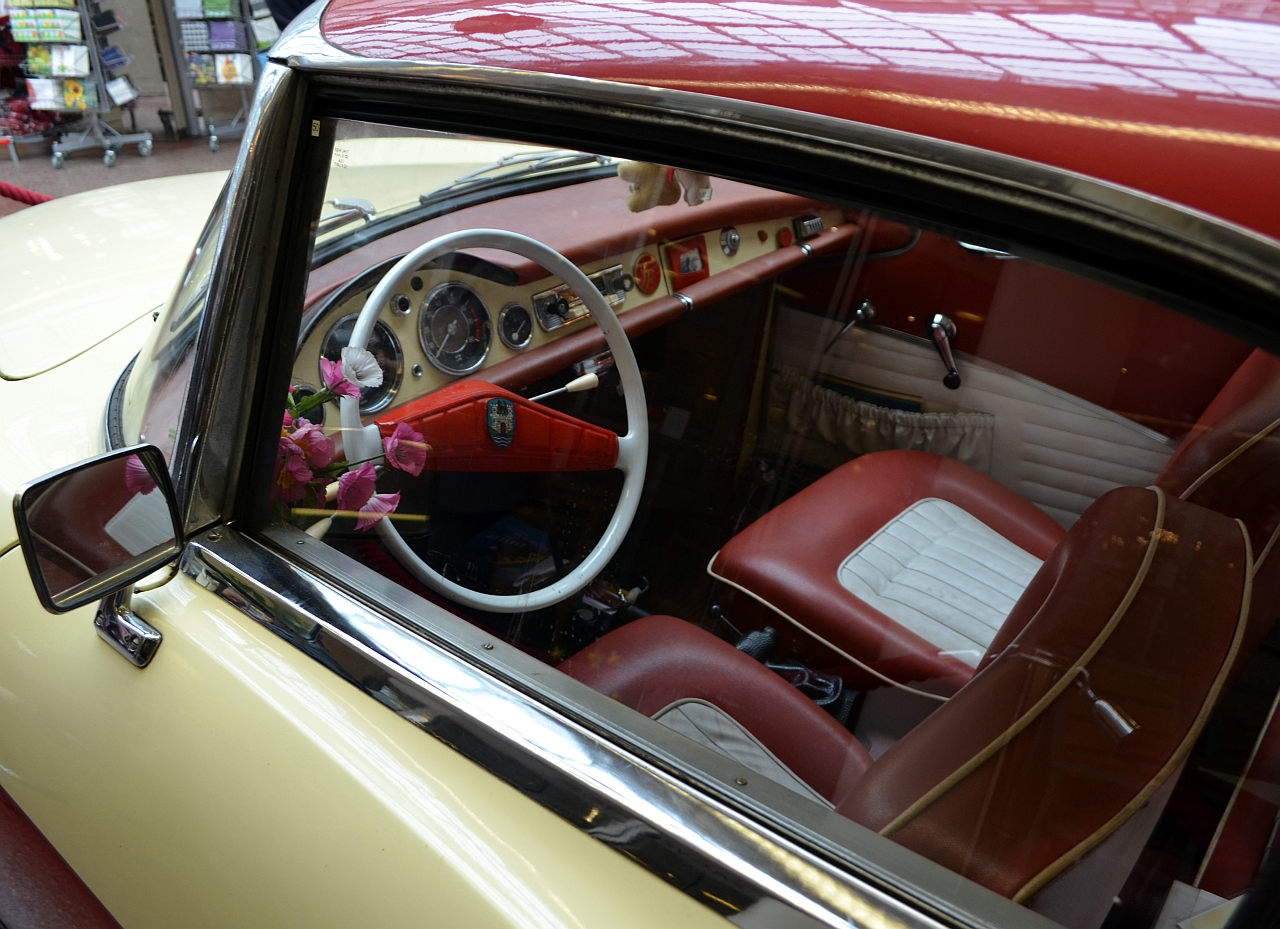

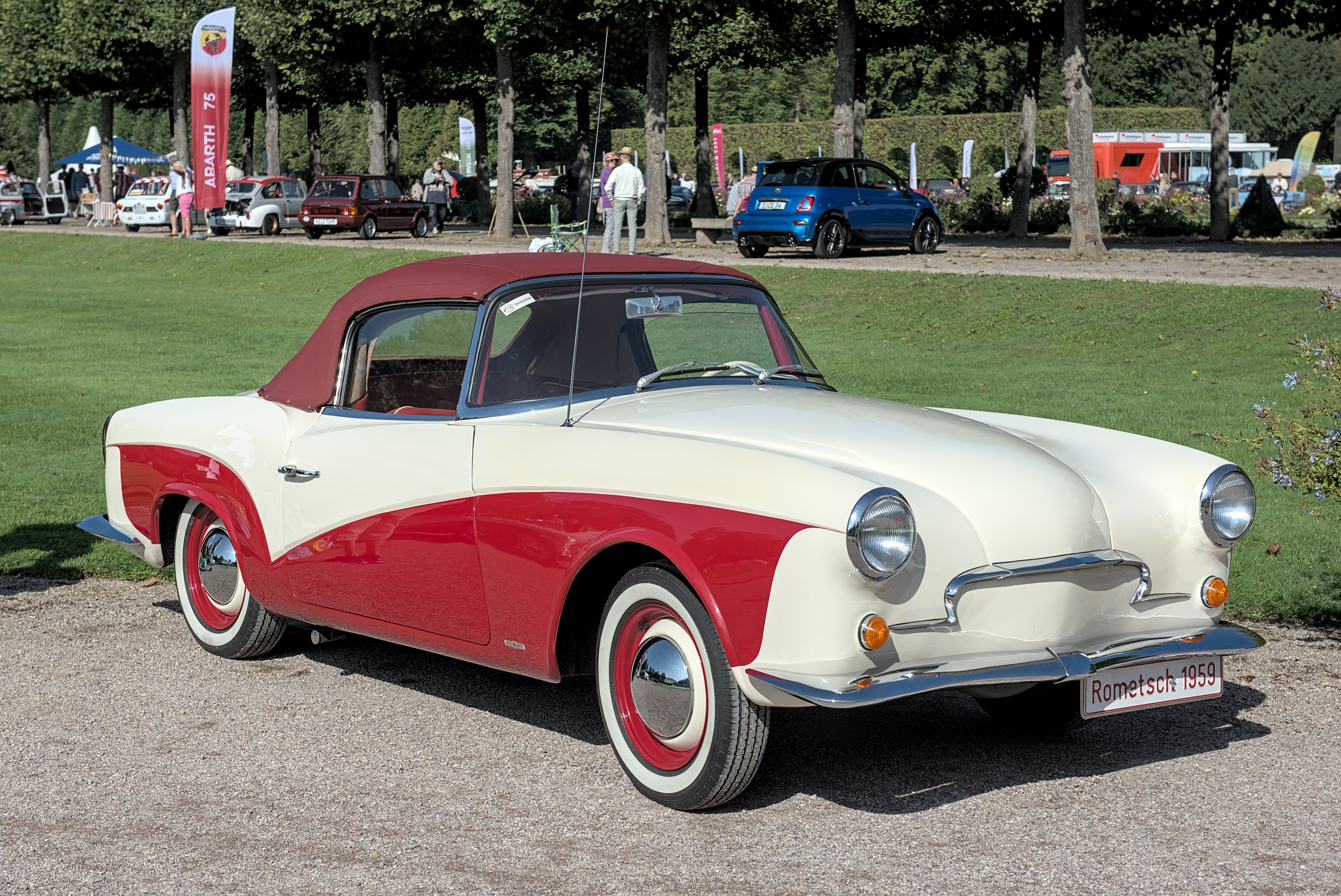
Rometsch Lawrence Coupé
