= Putting-out system =

System of production organization

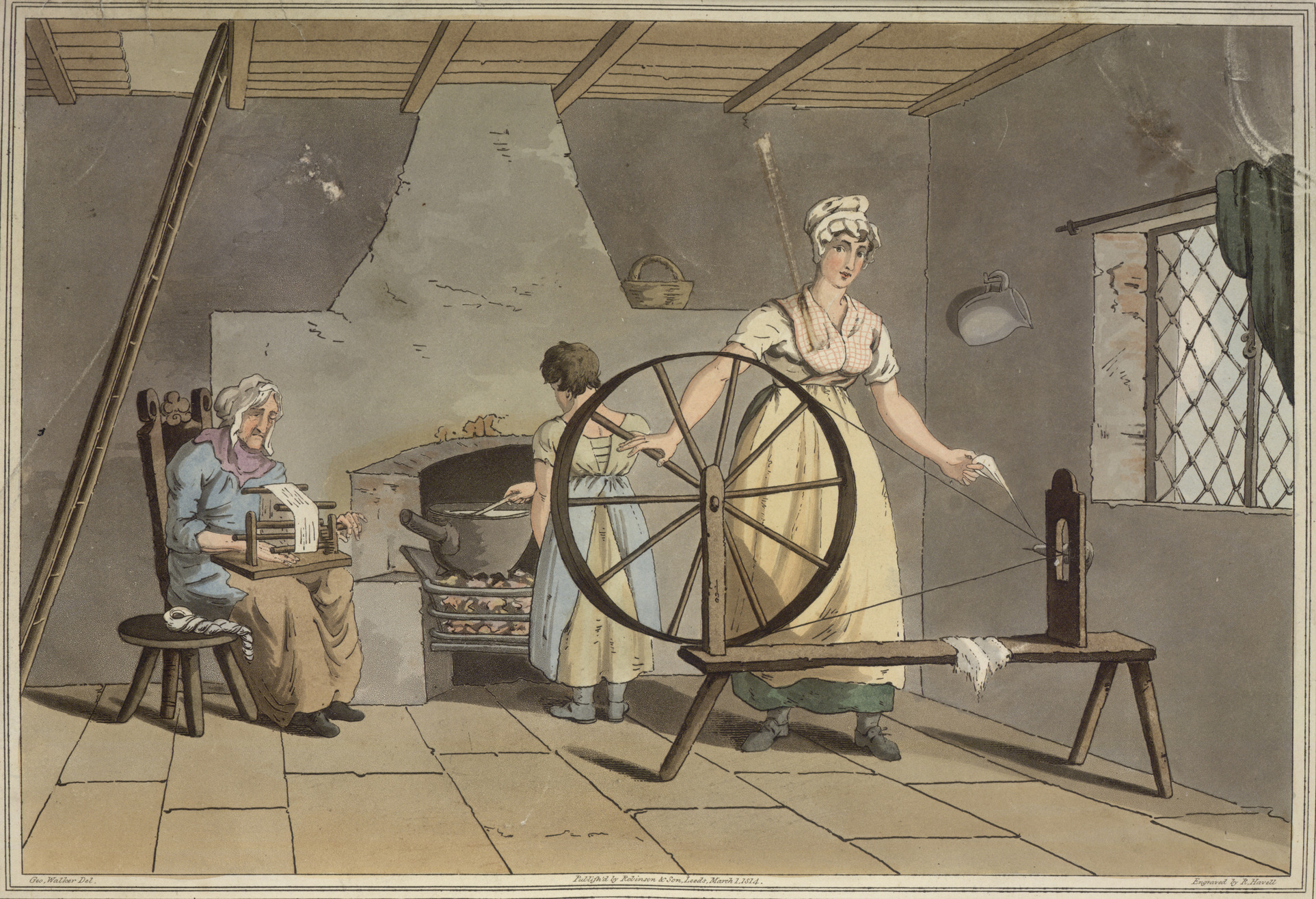
George Walker, 1814

The putting-out system, also known historically as the domestic system or workshop system, was a method of subcontracting production in which a central agent, often a merchant or manufacturer, distributed raw materials to workers who completed the work in their own homes or small workshops. This system was widely used in pre-industrial Europe and early America, particularly in the textile industry, shoemaking, lock-making, and the production of small firearm parts. It flourished from the late Middle Ages through the Industrial Revolution, gradually declining in the mid-19th century with the rise of centralized factory production.

== Historical overview ==
The putting-out system was embedded in the socio-economic structures of agrarian and early-industrial societies. For most workers, it was not a voluntary or entrepreneurial choice but a necessary means of supplementing family income. The system was particularly suited to pre-urban rural economies, where travel to centralized workplaces was impractical, and households combined production tasks with agricultural and domestic chores.

The putting-out system is often regarded as a form of proto-industrialization, representing a transitional phase between artisanal production and factory-based industrial capitalism. Although mechanization and factory labor largely replaced domestic production in industrialized nations by the late 19th century, analogous forms of decentralized, home-based subcontracting still persist in parts of China, India, and South America, especially in labor-intensive industries. However, these contemporary practices differ significantly from the historical domestic system in terms of technology, labor relations, and economic context.

== By industry ==
=== Firearms ===
The historian David A. Hounshell writes:

In 1854, the British obtained their military small arms through a system of contracting with private manufacturers located principally in the Birmingham and London areas ... Although significant variation occurred, almost all of the contractors manufactured parts or fitted them through a highly decentralized, putting-out process using small workshops and highly skilled labor. In small arms making as in lock production, the "workshop system" rather than the "factory system" was the rule.

This system of dispersed processes was supplanted by inside contracting and, later, the factory system.

=== Cottage industry ===
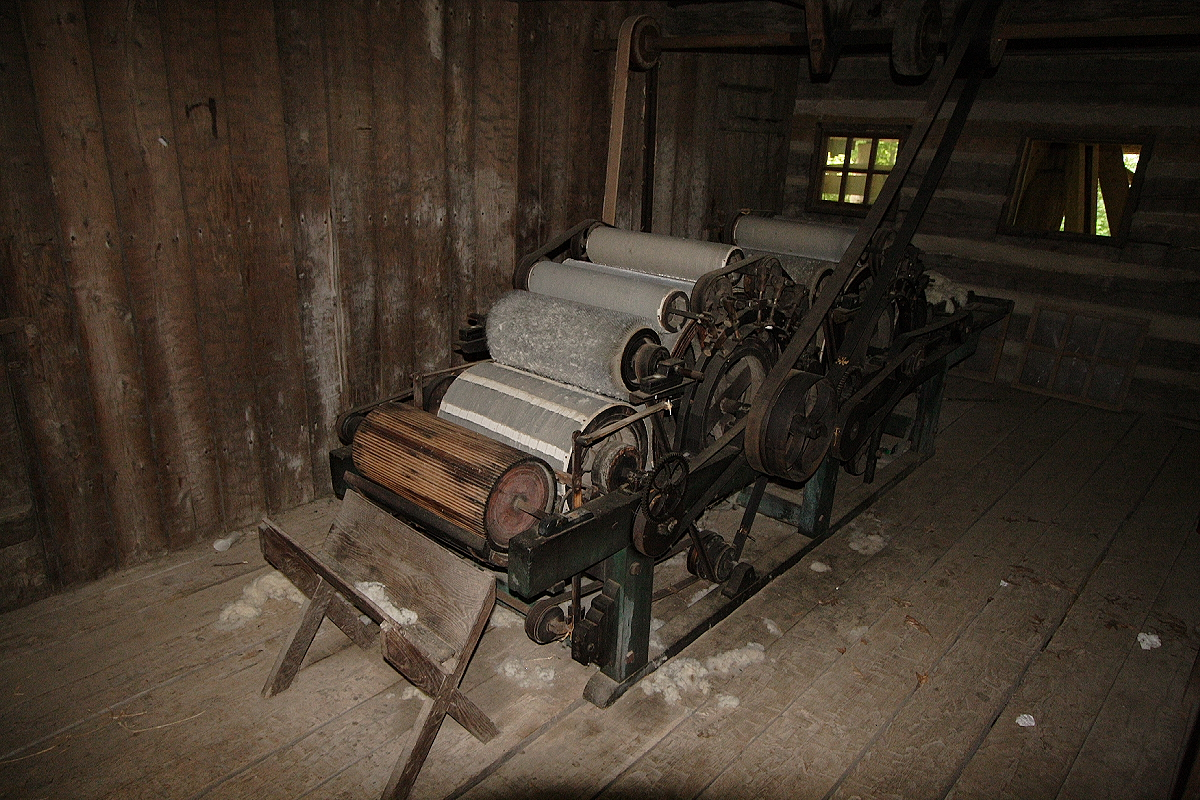
19th-century ox-powered double carding machine

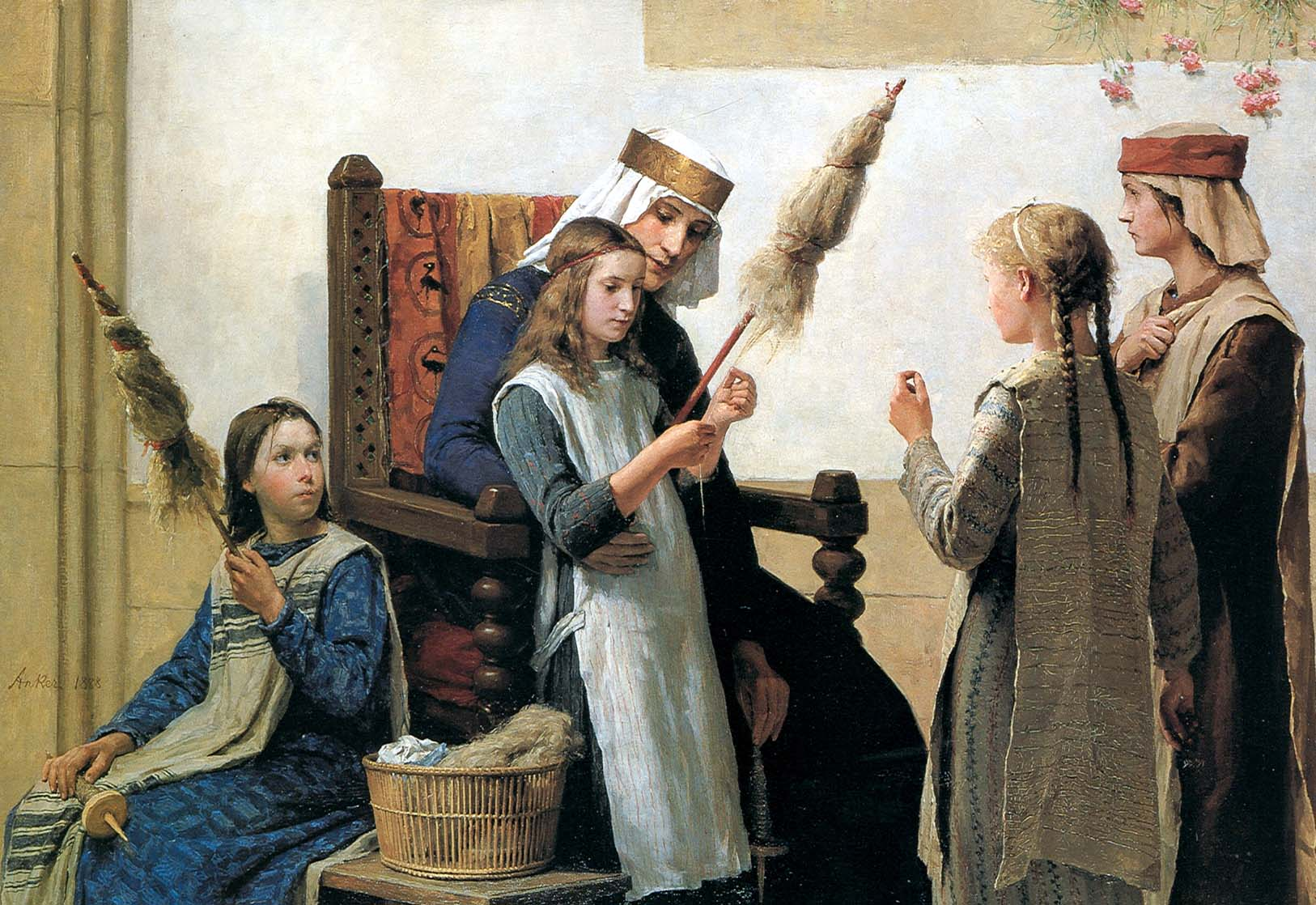
Queen Bertha of Burgundy instructing girls to spin flax on spindles using distaffs

A cottage industry is an industry—primarily manufacturing—which includes many producers, working from their homes, and originally was often organized through the putting-out system. The biggest participants in this system were the merchant capitalist and the rural worker. The merchant would "put out" basic materials to the cottage workers, who then prepared the materials in their own homes and returned the finished merchandise back to the merchant. The term first referred to home workers who were engaged in a task such as sewing, lace-making, wall hangings, or household manufacturing. Some industries which are nowadays usually operated from large, centralized factories were cottage industries before the Industrial Revolution. Business operators would travel around the world, buying raw materials, delivering them to people who would work on them, and then collecting the finished goods to sell locally or typically to ship to another market. One of the factors which allowed the Industrial Revolution to take place in Western Europe was the presence of these business people, who had the ability to expand the scale of their operations. In Russia, the Kustar were rural artisans engaged in cottage industries. Such industries were very common at a time when much of the population was engaged in agriculture, because the farmers and their families often had both the time and the desire to earn additional income during the part of the year (winter) when there was little work to do in farming or selling produce.

== By region ==
=== Europe ===
The domestic system was a popular system of cloth production in Europe. It was also used in various other industries, including the manufacture of wrought iron ironware such as pins, pots, and pans for ironmongers.

It existed as early as the 15th century, but was most prominent in the 17th and 18th centuries. It served as a way for employers and workers to bypass the guild system, which was thought to be cumbersome and inflexible, and to access a rural labor force. Having the workers work in their homes was convenient for both parties. Workers were working remotely, manufacturing individual articles from raw materials, then bringing them to a central place of business, such as a marketplace or a larger town, to be assembled and sold. In other cases travelling agents or traders would tour the villages, supplying the raw materials and collecting the finished goods. The raw materials were often provided by the merchant, who received the finished product, hence the synonymous term "putting-out system". The advantages of this system were that workers involved could work at their own speed, and children working in the system were better treated than they would have been in the factory system, although the homes might be polluted by the toxins from the raw materials. As the woman of a family usually worked at home, someone was often there to look after any children. The domestic system is often cited as one of the causes of the rise of the nuclear family in Europe, as the workers' earnings made them less dependent on their extended family. This often led to more prosperity among workers, with more furniture, and better food and clothing than they had had before. It was mostly centralized in Western Europe and did not take a strong hold in Eastern Europe.

Thomas Hood's poem "The Song of the Shirt" (1843) describes the wretched life of a woman in Lambeth labouring under such a system. It was written in honour of a woman who is known only as Mrs. Biddell, a Lambeth widow and seamstress who lived in a state of poverty. In what was, at that time, common practice, she sewed trousers and shirts in her home using materials given to her by her employer, for which she was forced to give a £2 deposit. In a desperate attempt to feed her starving infants, Mrs. Biddell pawned the clothing she had made, thus accruing a debt that she could not repay. Biddell was sent to a workhouse, and her ultimate fate is unknown; however, her story motivated those who actively opposed the wretched conditions of England's working poor, who often spent seven days a week labouring under inhuman conditions, barely managing to survive and with no prospect of relief.

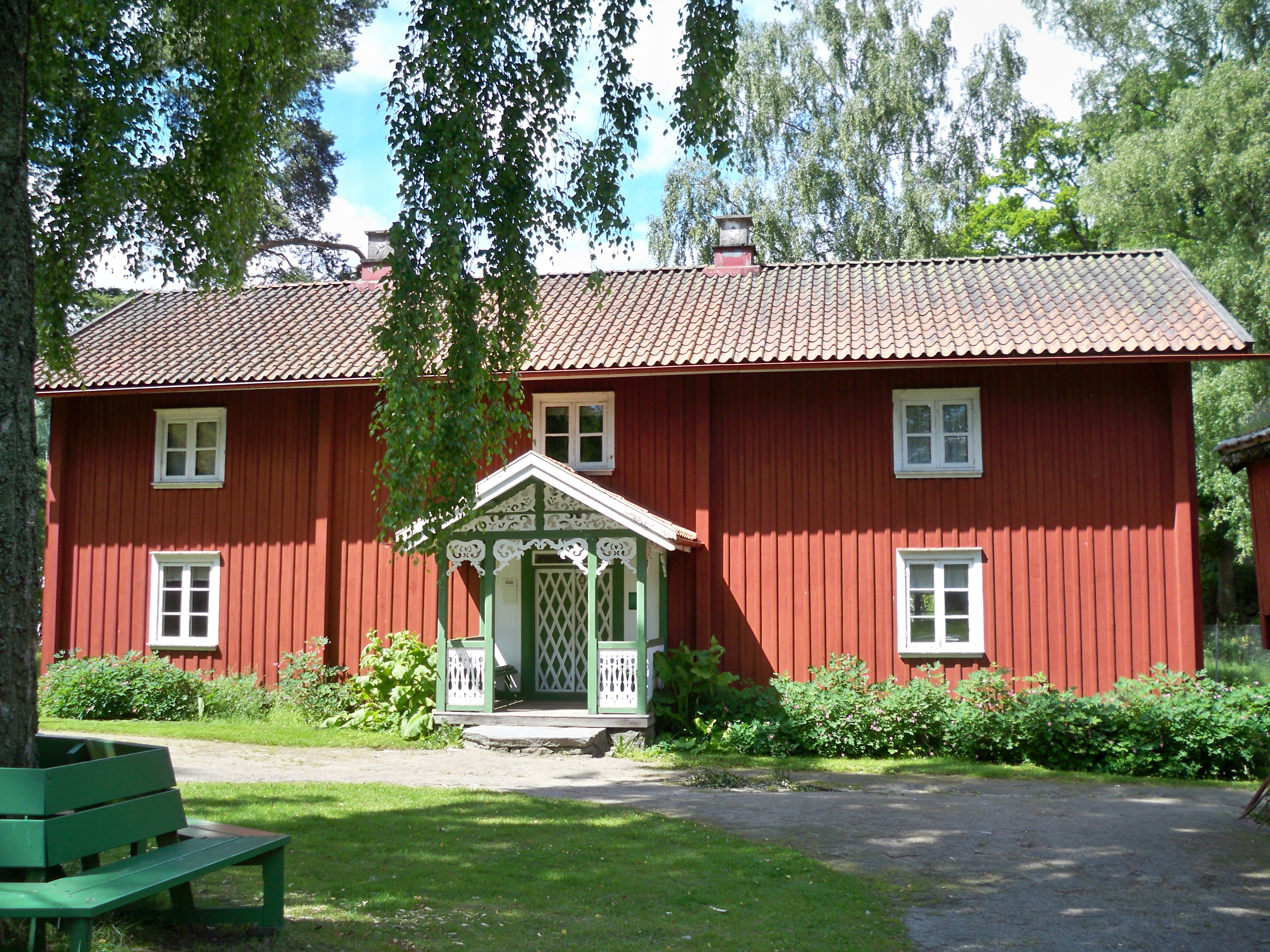
1795 home of a Swedish businessman who contracted up to 200 domestic workers, who came here to get the raw material and returned after a couple of weeks with textiles, which local peddlers from the city of Borås then bought.

Anders Jonsson (1816–1890) was a famous Swedish entrepreneur who continued a putting-out business at Holsljunga. He contracted up to 200 domestic workers, who came to his house to get the raw material and returned after a couple of weeks with textiles, which local pedlars from the city of Borås then bought and went out to sell, among other things, around Sweden and Norway.

=== Switzerland ===
In Switzerland, the putting-out system, referred to in German as the Verlagssystem, became a predominant mode of decentralized home-based production during the era of proto-industrialization. Although it rarely became the exclusive form of production in any given sector, it played a central role in industries such as textile manufacturing and watchmaking. Under this system, entrepreneurs supplied workers with raw materials or semi-finished goods to be processed at home, typically in exchange for wages paid upon completion of the work within a set timeframe. In textiles, these deadlines often ranged from one to two weeks, while in watchmaking they could extend up to six months.

In some industries, entrepreneurs did not deal directly with home-based workers but operated through intermediaries such as commissioners or agents. Unlike the Kaufsystem, where artisans purchased raw materials themselves, the Verlagssystem required the entrepreneur to possess working capital to supply inputs, though not necessarily fixed capital assets like factory buildings.

The Verlagssystem appeared in Switzerland in the early 16th century, with one of the earliest examples being the Fleckenstein-de Sala company in Lugano. Its significance grew by the late 16th century, particularly in Geneva and Zurich. However, this expansion often required overcoming resistance from guilds, whose regulations restricted production to organized urban crafts. The eventual adoption of the Verlagssystem facilitated the growth of industries such as silk ribbon manufacturing in Basel and the basin (cotton-linen mixed fabric) industry in Zurich. For entrepreneurs, the system offered flexibility, allowing them to adjust production volume, products, and workforce size according to demand.

Despite this, guild-based artisanal work retained importance for the production of high-quality and complex goods. In Geneva, for instance, the transformation into a manufacturing hub during the second half of the 16th century was accompanied by the establishment of numerous craft guilds.

In Zurich, the Verlagssystem's expansion in the late 16th and early 17th centuries increased the dependency of small-scale producers—both urban and rural—on large city-based merchants. These merchants opened new markets and encouraged the development of new textile branches. They also intensified direct imports of raw materials, such as cotton from Venice and Lyon, as well as silk and wool. The system often functioned as a form of commercial credit relationship between merchants and rural manufacturing supervisors, particularly in regions like Glarus, Toggenburg, Appenzell Outer Rhodes, and the Rhine Valley.

In the Basel silk ribbon industry, merchants exercised tight control over both semi-finished goods and production tools, maintaining direct contact with rural workers. This high degree of dependency limited the development of rural enterprises into the late 19th century. Conversely, Zurich's cotton craft industry nominally operated under the Kaufsystem until the mid-18th century, though in practice it had already adopted many characteristics of the Verlagssystem. City merchants retained exclusive rights to import raw materials, oversee finishing processes, and export finished goods. Rural production supervisors—mostly women—relied on commercial credit from urban merchants and often subcontracted tasks to home-based weavers, sometimes using intermediaries themselves.

Challenges inherent to the Verlagssystem, such as the misappropriation of raw materials and the prevalence of in-kind wages, eventually led to the development of regulatory legislation.

== See also ==
- Dorset button
- Independent contractors
- Piece-rate list
- Ton'ya (問屋) trade brokers of ancient Japan

== Bibliography ==
- Hounshell, David A. (1984), From the American System to Mass Production, 1800–1932: The Development of Manufacturing Technology in the United States, Baltimore, Maryland: Johns Hopkins University Press, ISBN 978-0-8018-2975-8, LCCN 83016269, OCLC 1104810110
- Williamson, Oliver E. (1985), The Economic Institutions of Capitalism, New York: The Free Press, ISBN 978-0-684-86374-0
