= Erdmann & Rossi =

Erdmann & Rossi was originally a coachbuilding company based in Berlin, Germany. In the early half of the 20th century, the company became known for the manufacture of chassis used on luxury vehicles. After the devastation of World War II, the company was unable to recover financially.

== History ==
Founded in 1898 by Willy Erdmann, the company began manufacturing coaches with Wheelwright in Luisenstraße, Berlin, Germany. In 1906, car salesman Eduard Rossi joined the company, which was then engaged in metallurgic coachbuilding for cars. Rossi, though younger than Erdmann, became CEO and moved the company to Linienstraße, Berlin. A short time later in 1909, Rossi died in an accident. This left Erdmann to serve as CEO until his retirement. In the early years, Erdmann & Rossi had about 50 employees and was not well known outside the region.

=== The Golden Era ===
Friedrich Peters, who was from Schwerin, became the CEO of Erdmann & Rossi. Peters had worked in various positions at the company before marrying a wealthy customer who made him acquire the company in 1910. Peters' affable nature helped him to establish good relations with members of the nobility and others in similar positions of power. In 1912, Erdmann & Rossi received the royal warrant for the Grand Duchy of Mecklenburg-Strelitz. Wilhelm II, German Emperor ordered luxury cars as gifts for foreign heads of state and top politicians, such as Enver Pasha, Ottoman Minister of War.

World War I disrupted and reduced the company's production. Besides body repair jobs, Erdmann & Rossi only built vehicles for medical use and mail delivery during this period.

In the 1920s, the company moved to Karlsruher Straße in Berlin, and by the 1930s, its business model focused more on putting high-end bodies onto frames built by German and other manufacturers. The company also became the German representative for Rolls-Royce Motor Cars and Bentley. Erdmann & Rossi modified trucks to add advertisements for other companies, including international producers such as Maggi.

After the Nazi seizure of power, the company took advantage of the new political situation. Leading Nazis like Hermann Göring and Rudolf Hess became customers, as did celebrities loyal to the regime like race car driver Bernd Rosemeyer, who ordered the Horch 853 Coupé "Manuela" in 1937/38, and the first German recipient of an Academy Award Emil Jannings, whose modified Mercedes is still exhibited in Aalholm Castle, Lolland. Other famous clients included race car driver Rudolf Caracciola, pilot Ernst Udet, and Ernst Heinkel.

In 1933, one of the company's competitors, Wagenfabrik Jos in Neuss, with around 60 employees, was acquired by the company and moved to Berlin-Halensee. Its formative designer Karl Trutz retired and Johannes Beeskow became the chief designer. During this time, Erdmann & Rossi was Germany's leading luxury coach builder, followed by the remaining competitor Voll & Ruhrbeck from Charlottenburg. Beeskow and Peters liked aerodynamic car shapes and various innovative ideas.

Also in Halensee, coach builder Rometsch, which specialized in mid-sized cars like Opel (a later subsidiary of General Motors) cooperated with them. Designer Beeskow started working for Rometsch after the war. A new business line was adding luxury interiors to Junkers Ju 52 for Lufthansa.

About 200 workers (250 at peak) manufactured two to three car bodies per week. Individual custom designs for royal houses were created, for example, for Prince Bernhard of Lippe-Biesterfeld of the Netherlands, or in 1935, a Mercedes-Benz 540K for the King Ghazi of Iraq, which was designed by Figoni et Falaschi.

Beeskow and Peters' brother Richard often traveled to England, where Beeskow was inspired by the British automotive design of J Gurney Nutting & Co Limited.

=== Decline due World War II ===
In 1936, Richard Peters took over the company from Friedrich Peters, who was ill and died a year later. When World War II began in 1939, Erdmann & Rossi shifted production from luxury bodies to only doing repairs.

There is almost no information about the equipping of Siebel Si 204, Focke-Wulf Fw 200 Condor and Breguet Aviation which were possibly used by the Luftwaffe. In the early 1940s, an aerial bombing of Berlin resulted in Erdmann & Rossi's archive burning to the ground, resulting a huge loss of information about its history. In 1943 to 1944, the remaining employees moved the company to Trebbin, Fläming Heath, twenty miles south of Berlin.

In 1949, the last car body was manufactured (assembled on a Maybach SW 42 chassis). Destruction from war, a difficult economy and the separation of Berlin, caused huge problems for re-establishing the former business. Richard, son of Günter Peters, was the last CEO.

== Gallery ==
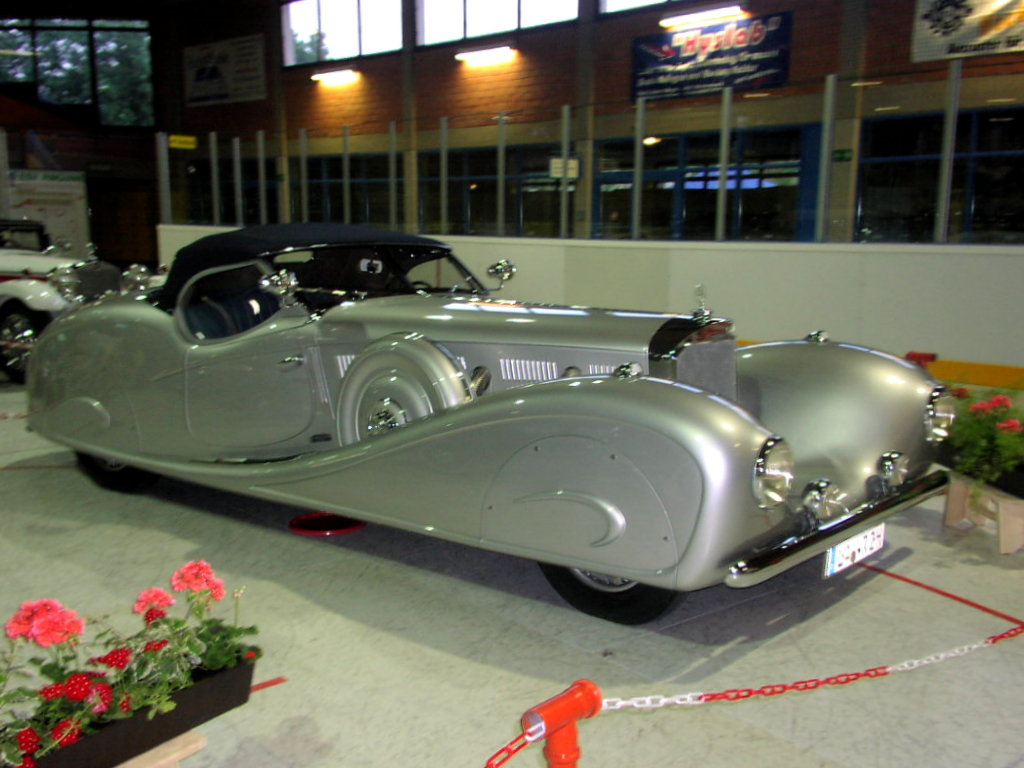
1935 Mercedes-Benz 500 K with body by Erdmann & Rossi for King of Iraq

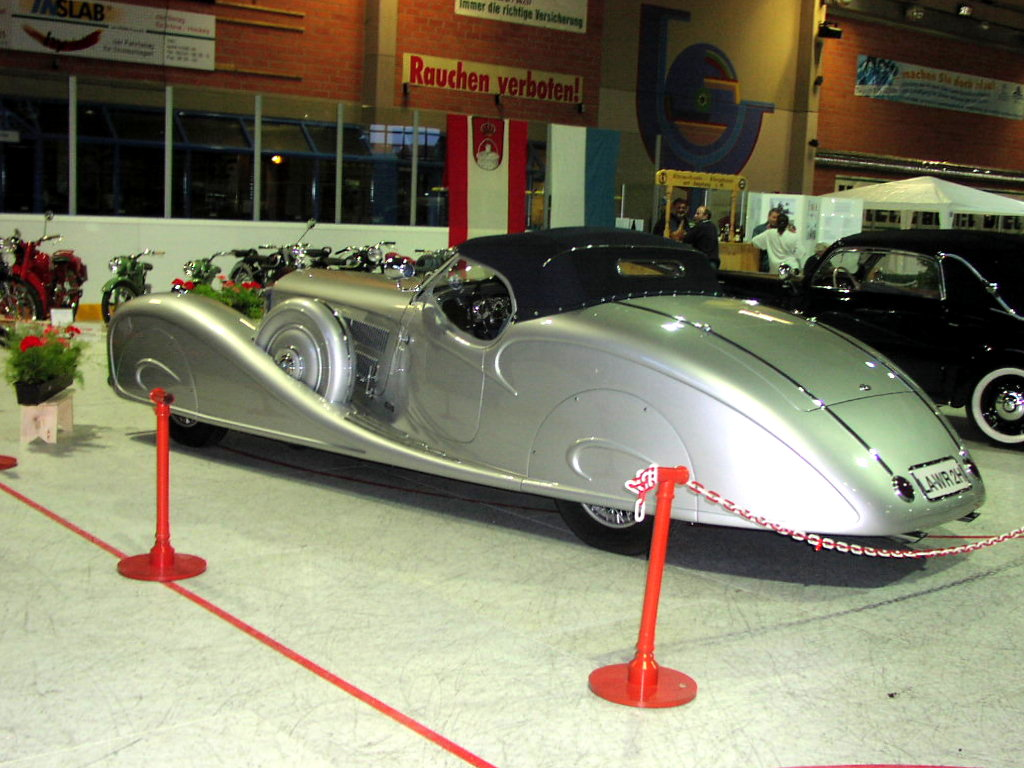
Mercedes-Benz 500 K with body by Erdmann & Rossi

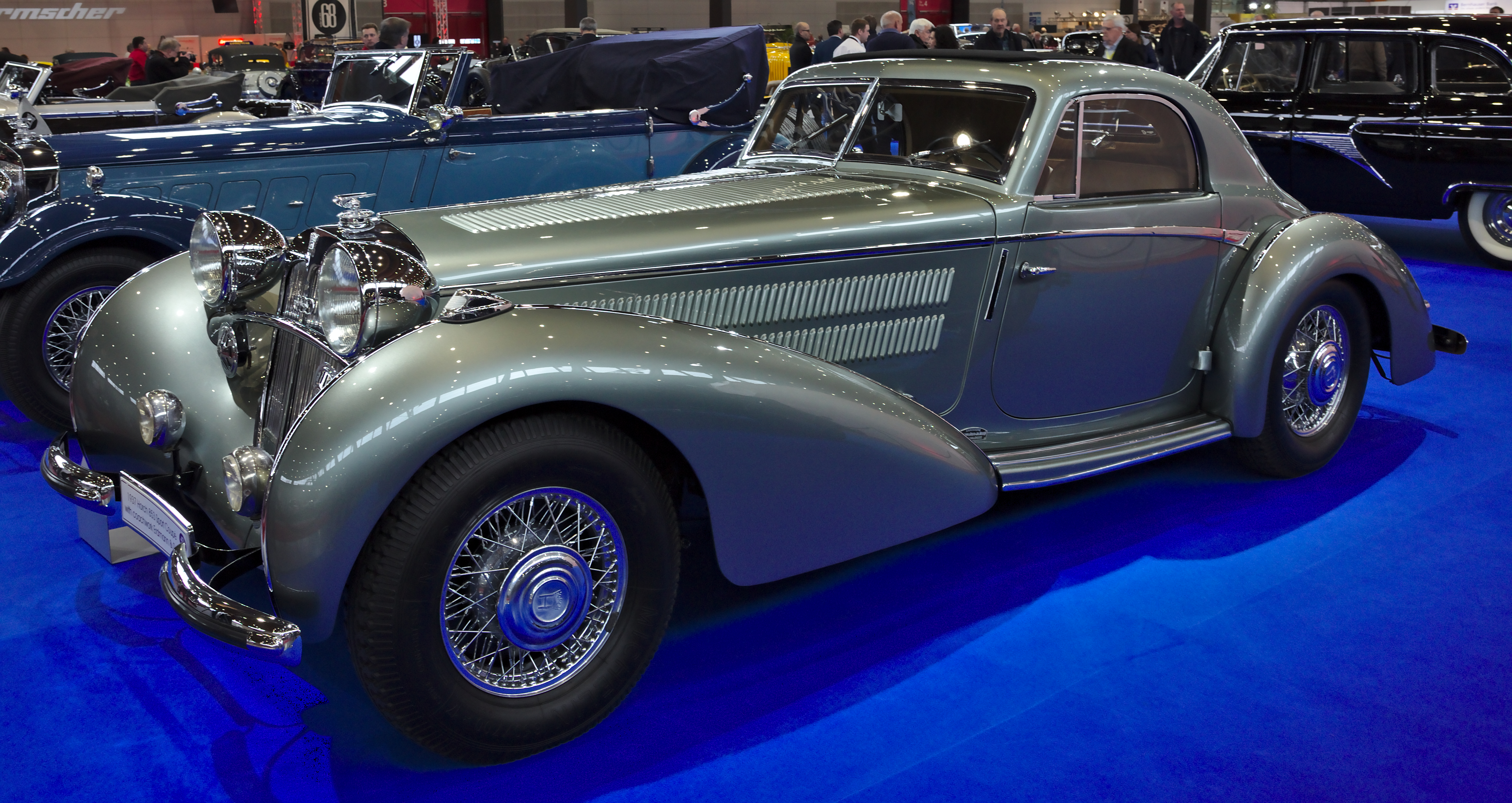
1937 Horch 853 Coupé with body by Erdmann & Rossi

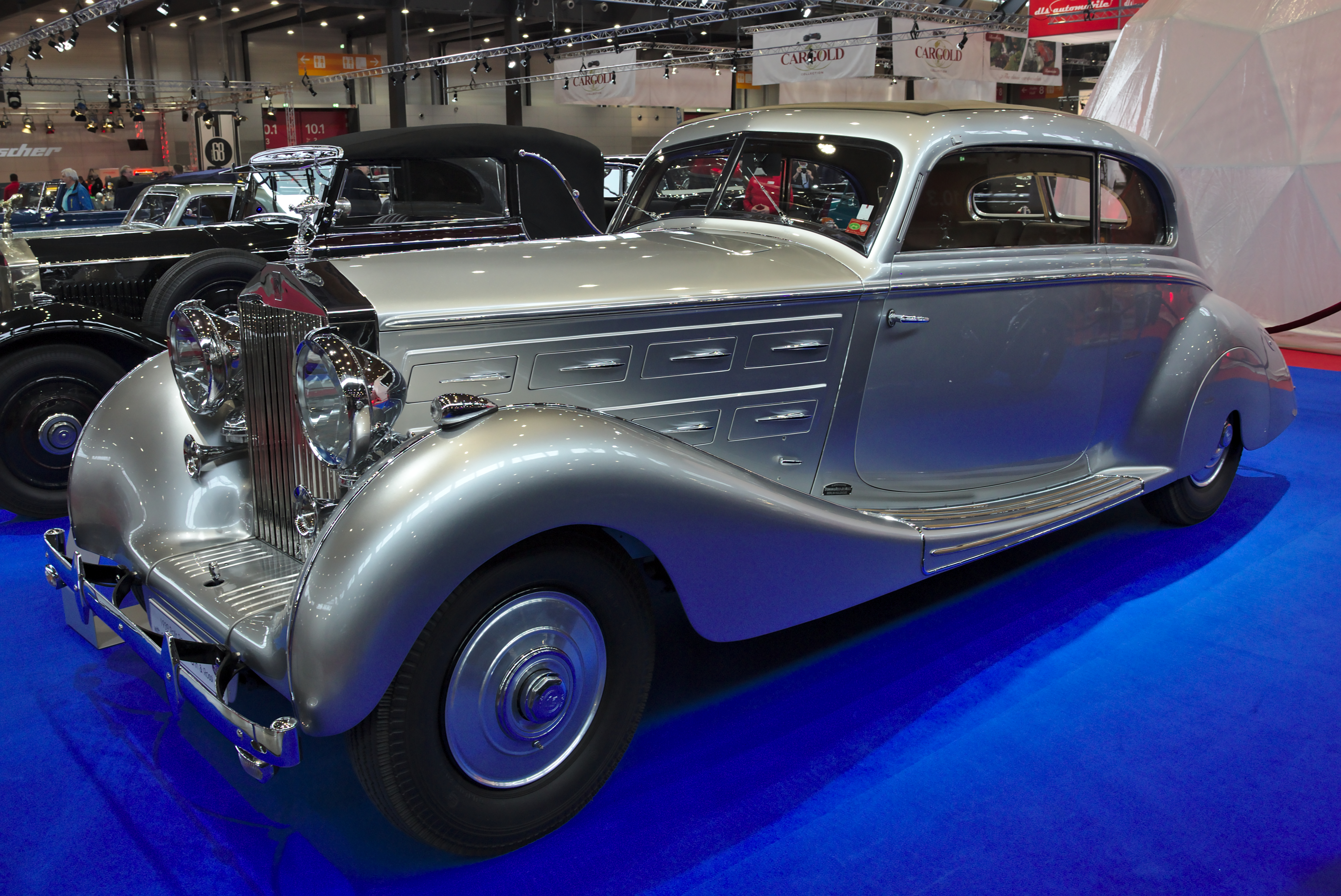
1939 Rolls-Royce Wraith Coupé with body by Erdmann & Rossi

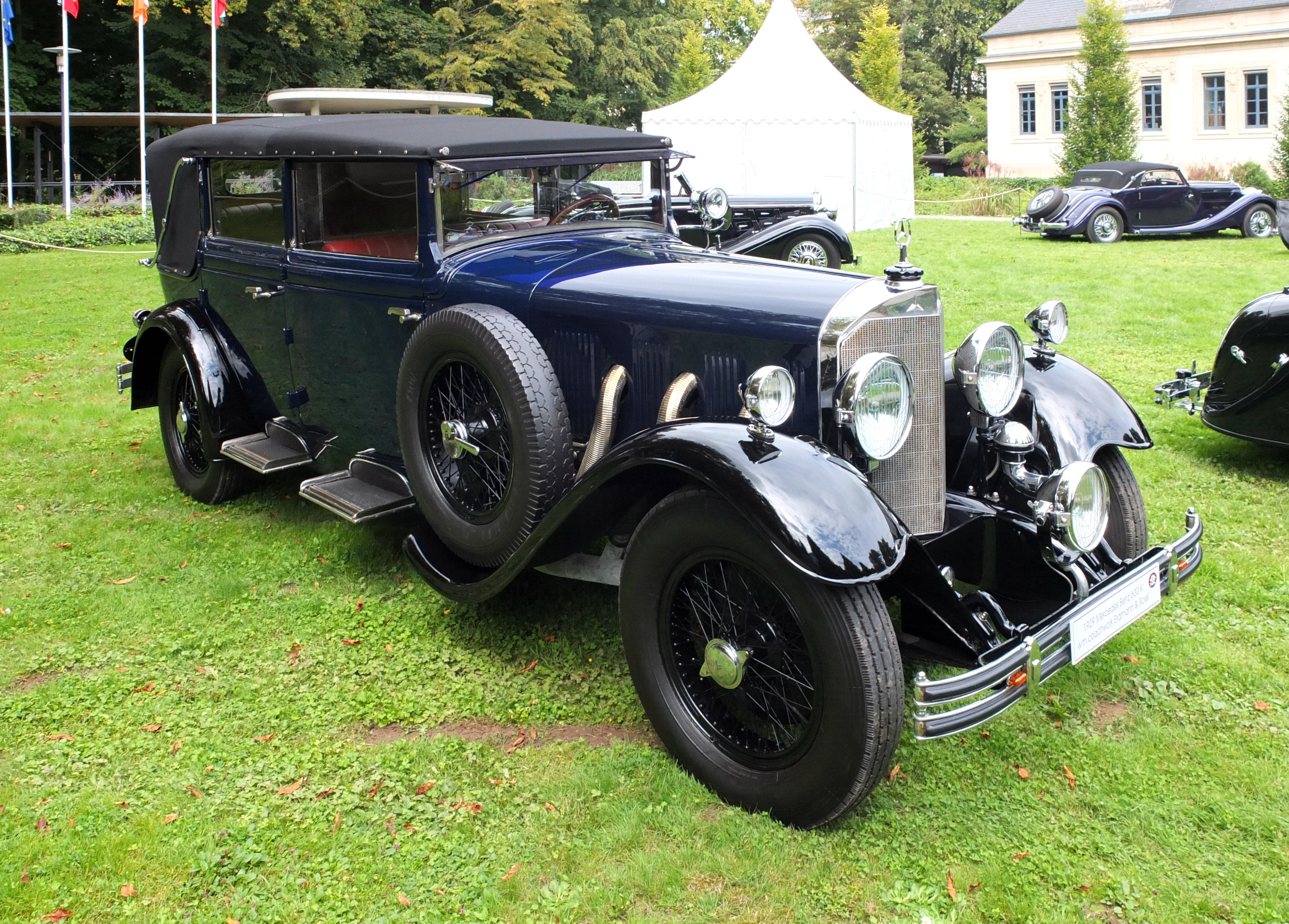
1929 Mercedes-Benz 630 K with body by Erdmann & Rossi

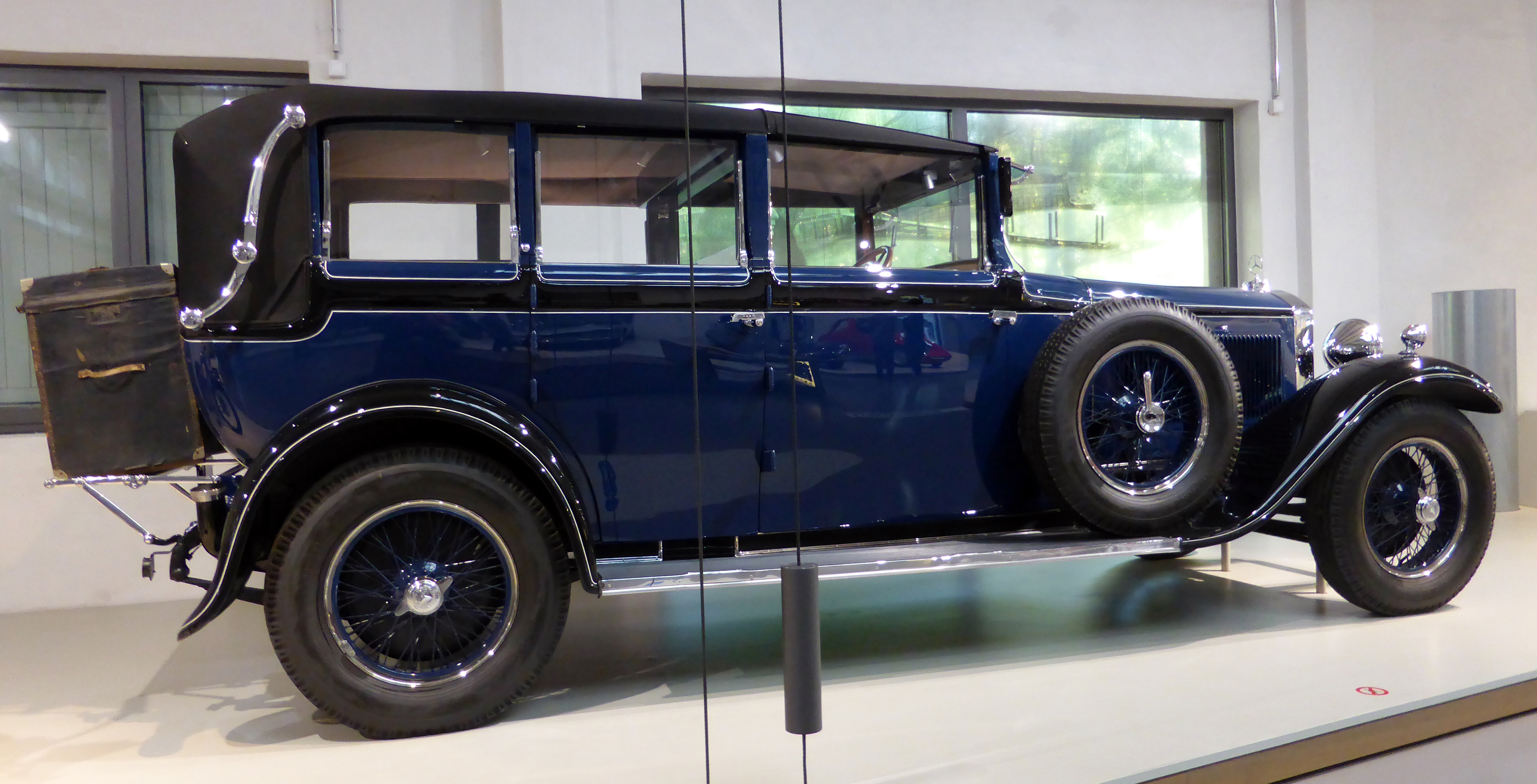
1929 Mercedes-Benz 460 Nürburg
