= Roe (ship) =

Several vessels have been named Roe:

- Roe (1797 ship) was built in France in 1787 and in 1797 became a Liverpool-based British slave ship. The French captured her in 1798 after she had delivered a cargo of slaves to Demerara.
- Roe (1801 ship) was launched in France in 1792, almost certainly under another name. The British captured her and between 1801 and 1808 she became a slave ship, making four voyages out of Liverpool. After the end of the British slave trade Roe traded with Brazil. The Americans captured her in 1812 but she was quickly recaptured. She was wrecked in November 1814 at Liverpool.

== See also ==
- USS Roe – either of two ships of that name
