= Rowing (disambiguation) =

Rowing is a form of propulsion of boats and other watercraft.

Rowing may also refer to:

== Boats ==
- Rowing (sport), competitive rowing
  - Coastal and ocean rowing, rowing performed on the sea
  - Ocean rowing, the sport of rowing across oceans

== Exercise ==
- Indoor rowing, rowing machine based exercise similar to rowing boats
- Rowing exercise, resistance training exercise

== Other ==
- Rowing (driving technique), also known as block shifting or skip shifting, downshifting more than one gear reduce wear on the gearbox
- Shouting match, or rowing, an argument
- A track on Soundgarden's 2012 studio album King Animal

== See also ==
- Roing, a town in Arunachal Pradesh, India
- Paddling
