= R.O.E. =

American singer and rapper

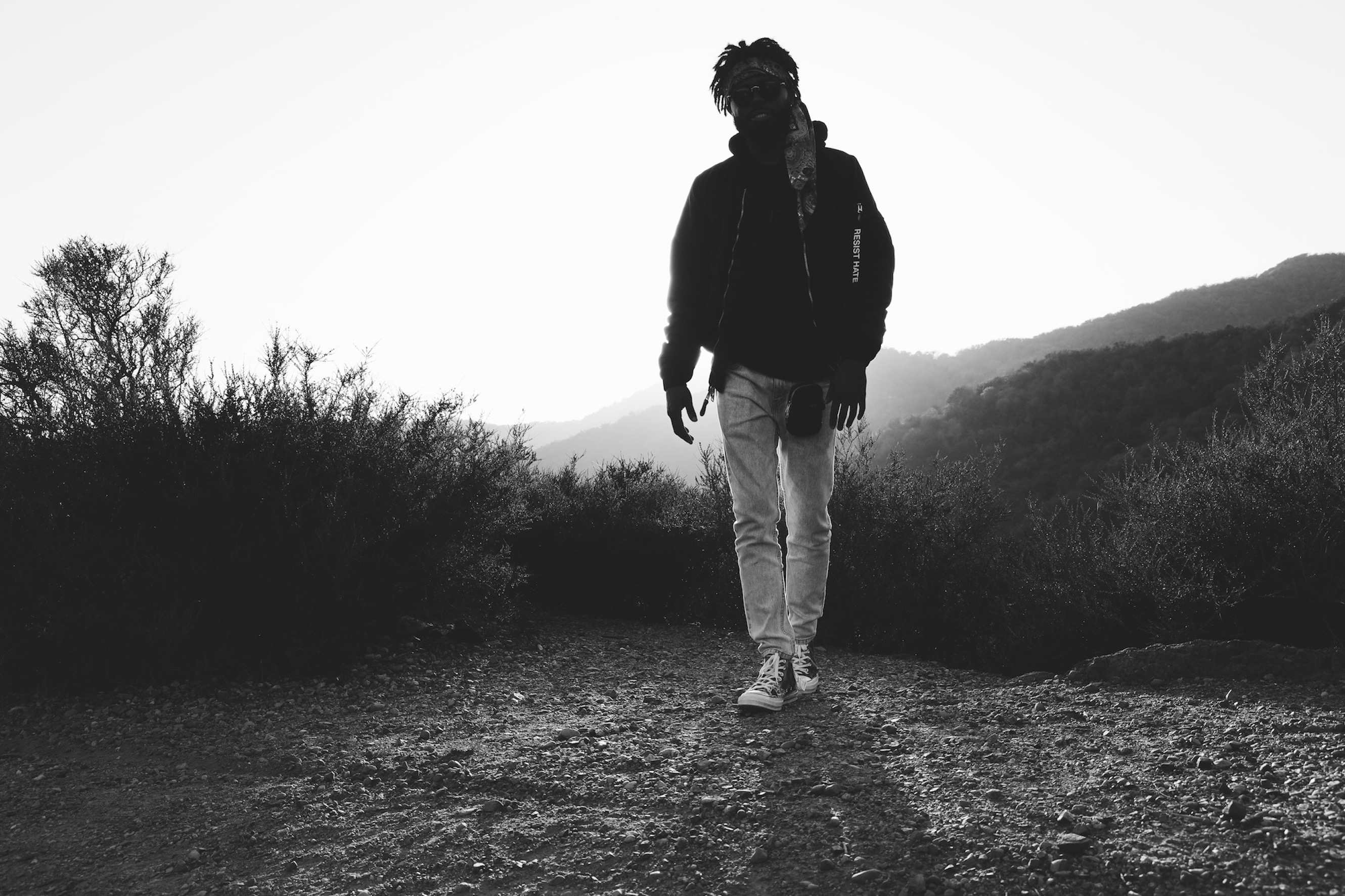

Background information
- Born: December 21, 1987 (age 38); Chicago, Illinois
- Genres: Alternative hip hop, alternative R&B
- Occupations: Singer, songwriter
- Years active: 2009–present
- Label: Sledge Enterprises
- Website: sledgeenterprises.com

Roosevelt Sledge, Jr. (known professionally as R. O. E. or R.O.E.) is an American singer and rapper from Chicago, Illinois, active in independent hip hop since the late 2000s. His stage name is an acronym for "Rising Over Envy" and is pronounced "roe." He drew early notice with the EP A Backpacker Named R.O.E. (2011) and later issued a live album recorded with his band the Soulvillains.

== Career ==
Sledge is from Chicago's West Side and performs under the moniker R.O.E., pronounced "roe," an acronym he explains as "Rising Over Envy." By early 2016 he had moved to New York City to pursue new opportunities and perspectives while continuing to release music and perform.

His singles have been discussed by Chicago public radio outlet Vocalo, which featured "Can’t Stop" (2020) and "Money Ain’t a Thing" (2021) in its In Rotation selections.

== Discography ==
- Money in Motion (2021)
- Can't Stop Loving You (2022)
- Santa Monica Blues (2023)
- Frequency (2023)
- Turning Point (2024)
