= Skid row (disambiguation) =

A skid row is a part of a city known for high vagrancy and poor maintenance.

Skid Row may also refer to:

== Music ==
- Skid Row (Irish band), 1960s blues-rock band
- Skid Row (American band), American rock band
  - Skid Row (Skid Row album), 1989
- Skid Row (James Ferraro album), 2015
- Nirvana (band), former name Skid Row
- "Skid Row (Downtown)", a song in the musical Little Shop of Horrors

== Other uses ==
- Confessions of a Vice Baron, a 1943 American film reissued as Skid Row
- Radio Skid Row, a community radio station in Sydney, Australia
- Skid Row, Los Angeles, a neighborhood in Los Angeles, California
- SKIDROW, a software cracking group
