= Roe (given name) =

Roe is a masculine given name borne by the following people:

- Roe Conn (born 1964), American talk radio host
- Roe Ethridge (born 1969), American commercial and art photographer
- Roe Erister Rick Hall (1932–2018), American record producer, songwriter and musician
- Roe Messner (born 1935), American building contractor, husband of Tammy Faye Bakker
