= The Honey Trees =

American dream pop band

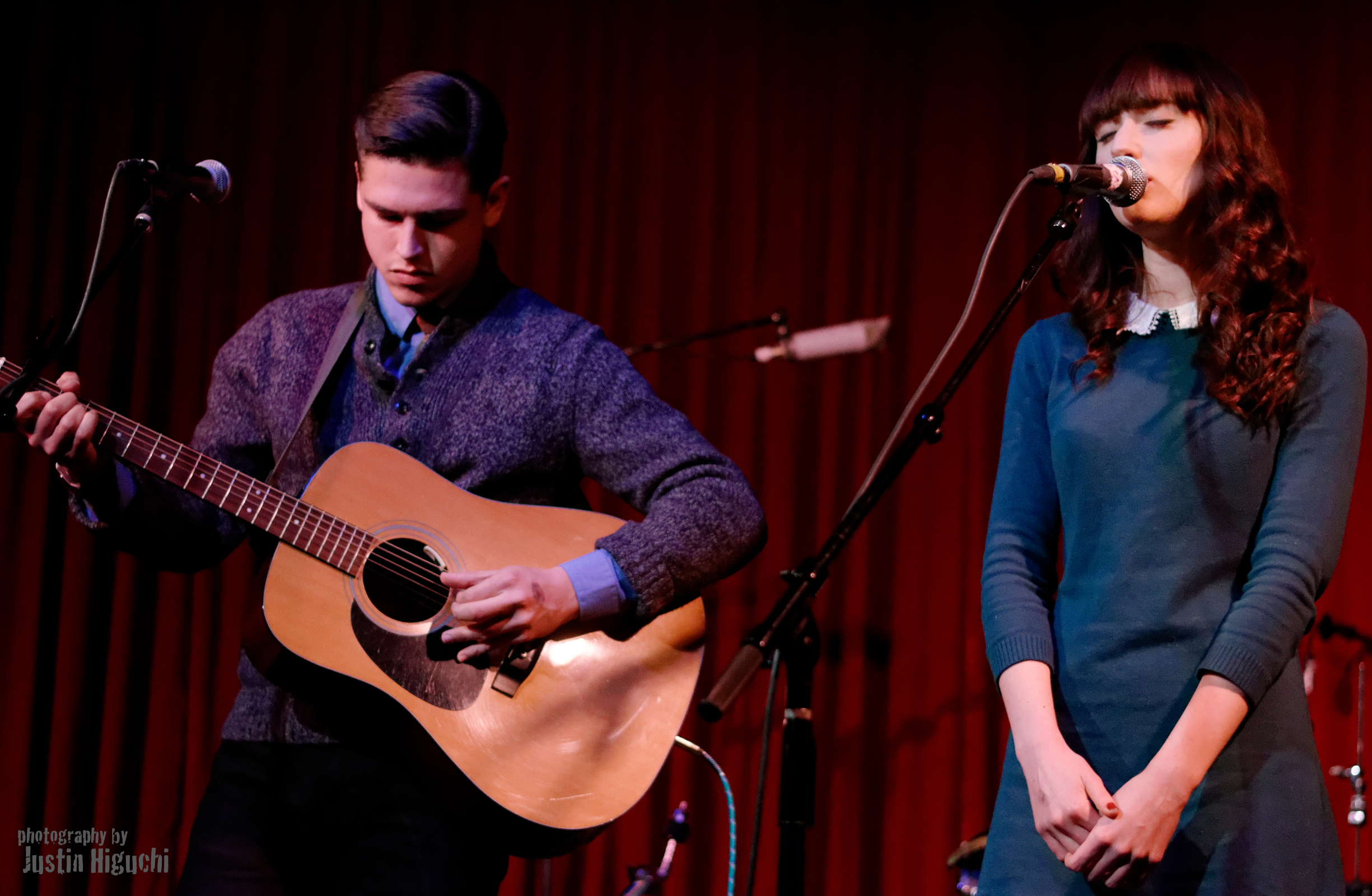

Background information
- Origin: Sacramento, California and San Luis Obispo, California
- Genres: Dream pop, indie
- Years active: 2008-2014
- Members: Becky Louise Filip, Jacob Wick

The Honey Trees were an American dream pop band from Sacramento and San Luis Obispo, and consisted of Becky Filip and Jacob Wick.

== History ==
The band began in 2008. They released an EP titled Wake the Earth, produced by Charlie Peacock in Nashville. Wick joined in 2008. The band's name originated from a nickname of one of Filip's friends. The band was expanded to a quartet which performed live. After years of playing live, changing and perfecting themselves, they released a full-length album, Bright Fire. The album was released on April 8, 2014, four years after they began recording it. The album was produced by Jeremy Larson in his studio in Springfield, Missouri.

On November 6, 2019, Filip announced on the band's Facebook page that she was beginning a new solo project under the name "Rowe".

== Discography ==
- Wake The Earth EP (self-released, 2009)
- Bright Fire (self-released, 2014)
