= Roes Spring =

Coordinates: 34°31′35.31″N 84°52′6.79″W

Roes Spring is a spring in Gordon County, in the U.S. state of Georgia.

Roes Spring was named in honor of the Roe family.

== See also ==
- List of rivers of Georgia (U.S. state)
