= Piece-rate list =

Pay scale for cotton workers

Piece-rate lists were the ways of assessing a cotton operatives pay in Lancashire in the nineteenth and early twentieth centuries. They started as informal agreements made by one cotton master and their operatives then each cotton town developed their own list. Spinners merged all of these into two main lists which were used by all, while weavers used one 'unified' list.

== Background to the industry ==
Early cotton spinning mills in Derbyshire and later in Manchester and Lancashire used cotton-jennies and mules. The proprietors put out the spun cotton to hand loom weavers who wove it into pieces for which they were paid. In the Pennine counties many established woollen weavers switched their looms to cotton and more entrepreneurs invested in cotton spinning mills.

When cast iron power looms became reliable, the mill-owners added weaving sheds to their mills then employed relatively unskilled women and children (half-timers). Each minded four looms while a skilled tackler gaited the looms and kept them tuned. Mule-spinners and power loom weavers were also being paid by piece.

As the 18th century progressed each town developed a different specialism. Oldham was a spinning town producing fine counts while Wigan did coarse. Burnley became a weaving town, producing plain calicos for printing, while but Blackburn did fancies using Jacquard looms. In the 20th century there was consolidation into larger units of production. To the north-east thousand-loom sheds were built while to the south we saw the quarter of a million spindles Edwardian ring spinning mills. Ring spinners were usually paid by the hour not the piece.

== What is a list ==
For the calculation of wages piece-rate lists were universally employed as regards the payment of full weavers and mule-spinners; some piecers got a definite share of the total wage thus assigned to a pair of mules, while others were paid a fixed weekly amount. Many ring-spinners were mainly paid an hourly wage. Other operatives were almost universally so paid by list, with the exception of the hands in the blowing-room and on the carding-machines.

Individually negotiating with the spinner or weaver how much should be paid for each job clearly was not feasible and a table listing the payment for each task was drawn up by each employer. As operatives then moved to the proprietor who paid the most, 'lists' were put together to agree a standard between mills and sheds in a neighbourhood. The list ensured uniformity of treatment and became an item that demanded vigorous discussion to ensure the differentials were maintained.

Spinning and weaving lists were most complicated; discounts were made in them for most incidents beyond the operatives' control. They could not cover all circumstances however, so much was left as to the manner of their application to private arrangement.

The highest wages were earned by mule-spinners (who were all males); their assistants, known as piecers, were more poorly paid. Piecers would hope to eventually become "minders", i.e. mule-spinners in charge of mules. The division of the total wage paid on a pair of mules between the minder and the piecers was largely the result of the policy of the spinners' trade union. Almost without exception in Lancashire one minder took charge of a pair of mules with two or three piecers assisting. The wage of fine spinners about 25 to 35 above that of a coarse weaver.

Among the weavers there was no rule as to the number of assistants to full weavers (who are both male and female), or, after the 'More looms system' came in, as to the number of looms managed by a weaver, but the proportion of assistants was less than in spinning branches.

=== Discounts ===
Discounts is the principle that no operative should suffer if he was allocated substandard cotton, or put on a machine that output a lower capacity.

== History ==
The history of lists stretches back to the first quarter of the 19th century as regards spinners, and to about the middle of the century generally as regards weavers, though a weaving list agreed to by eleven masters was drawn up as early as 1834. There are still many different district lists in use, but the favourite spinning lists are those of Oldham and Bolton, and the weaving list most generally employed is that known as the "Uniform List" (1892), which is a compromise between the lists of Blackburn, Preston and Burnley.

A copy of the Bolton list of 1844 was published by the British Association Report in 1887, but this was not the first. It is believed that the Bolton list for spinners dated from 1813 and this embraced discounts. It the 1830s there was much agitation to agree lists, and the Bolton list was often discussed. There was an Oldham list for weavers in 1834, this was in place fifteen years before the Oldham Weavers' Association was formed in 1859. The Burnley weaving list was drawn up in 1843 and the Blackburn lists for weaving, looming, winding, beam-warping and tape-sizing were drawn up by joint committees in 1853.

In general, the pressure to adopt lists came from the operatives themselves. (Note: The first objective of the East Lancashire Amalgamated Power Loom association (1859) was to keep up our present rate of wages to the standard list, and to resist any attempt to reduce the same, and also to prevent one employer from paying less than another for the same amount and quality of work, and more particularly to bring up the prices of those who are paying the lowest wages.) Many lists were drawn up and frequently revised, so by 1887, twenty two lists had been drawn up and most abandoned. The Hyde, Stockport and Ashton lists were superseded by the Blackburn list (1853) for fine cloth – as had the Burnley, Chorley and Preston lists. When the Unified List was adopted in 1892, Ashton opted to stay with the Blackburn list.

The lists attempted to achieve fairness, and as such were very complex and the emerging unions employed staff to check the calculations which were known as 'The Sorts'. (Note: These union posts were subject to a competitive exam which test the ability to calculate "sorts".) David Shackleton, the future Independent Labour Party leader and MP for Clitheroe was employed by the Darwen Weavers', Winders' and Warpers' Association as secretary in 1894. In two years, he recalculated 3,237 sorts and discovered 1,290 underpayments. (40%) Some of these were honest mistakes other were due to the practice of 'nibbling'. To put this in context Shackleton himself had attended a dame school and church primary schools for which his father was charged. He started work as a part-timer at the legal age of nine and full-time at 13. Though he attended night school classes he never progressed beyond a primary school level education.

Lists continued until the 1920s.

=== Factory and Workshop Act 1891 ===
Under the "Particulars Clause", first included in the Factory and Workshop Act 1891 and given extended application in 1895, the particulars required for the calculation of wages must be rendered by the employer. In spinning there used to be doubts about the quantity of work done, so the "indicator", which measures the length of yarn spun came into general use. The Oldham spinning list differs from all others in that its basis is starts from an agreed normal time-wage. The piece-rates are reckoned so that can be achieved. But in effect this was implicit everywhere as when the average wages in a particular mill were lower than elsewhere for reasons not connected with the quality of labour (e.g. because of antiquated machinery or the low quality of the cotton used), the men demanded "allowances" to raise their wages to the normal level.

=== Brooklands Agreement ===
In 1893, the Brooklands Agreement was entered into by masters and men in the cotton spinning industry. Under this agreement advances and reductions could not exceed 5% or succeed one another by a shorter period than twelve months and must be preceded by a consultation or 'conference'. Usually the changes were between 5% or 2.50%. The men agreed that formal conciliation would take place between the interested parties before a strike broke out.
