= ROWE =

Kind of work environment

A results-only work environment (ROWE) is a work approach or organizational structure in which employees are entirely autonomous and responsible for delivering outcomes. This managerial tactic redirects attention from the hours spent at work to the results generated. Leaders mentor performance and oversee the work itself, instead of micromanaging employees' time.

A results-only work environment provides employees with complete autonomy over the timing, location, and methodology of their work. Instead of being bound to a specific workplace or schedule, personnel are responsible for achieving desired outcomes.

A results-only work environment (ROWE) is a modern work culture that rests on the principle that individuals are recruited to produce clear, measurable results. Managers focus on managing the work being accomplished rather than how other people work.

== Origins ==
In 2003, Best Buy headquarters in Minneapolis, Minnesota, initiated an innovation experiment called ROWE. Two employees, Jody Thompson and Cali Ressler, questioned the effectiveness of their work approach in generating optimal outcomes for both the company and its employees. They aimed to facilitate the employees, enabling the company to attain its desired results.

Some researchers refer to this as a dual agenda.

== Claimed advantages ==
Certified ROWE organizations report higher productivity, increased revenue, reduced turnover, and more successful recruitment. After achieving ROWE certification, JL Buchanan reported increases in employee engagement, productivity, profits, and top line sales. Early adopters of the ROWE system at Canada Mortgage and Housing Corporation (CMHC) showed consistently higher employee engagement scores compared to their co-workers as measured by quarterly pulse surveys; ROWE is purportedly the 'number one reason' new employees choose to work there.

=== Research ===
Biomarker data (blood pressure, body mass index, a pre-diabetes marker evident in blood, and more) was collected to create a cardio-metabolic risk score to predict the likelihood of a cardiovascular event. Employees who had higher risk scores at baseline reduced their risk of having a heart attack, stroke or other cardiovascular event by working in a ROWE when compared to a control group of employees not working in a ROWE.

Researchers collected saliva samples to measure cortisol levels before and after a ROWE implementation, and found a positive physiological effect on employees after the implementation. According to a Harvard Business School case study of a large organization, employees stated they "could not imagine returning to the old way of working".

According to eWorkplace, a study conducted in the Twin Cities metro area found that no longer requiring employees to drive to and from the office during rush hour traffic, reduces carbon emissions as well as wear and tear on roads. A Canadian government agency reported reduced gas emissions of 5.3 million kilometers.

Working in a ROWE also assists employees dealing with family crises.

=== Diversity, equity, and inclusion ===
McKinsey & Company recognized the results-only work environment as an example of diversity-enabling infrastructure. CMHC uses all of the data it collects to inform its D&I strategy and create targeted interventions to address pain points. CMHC’s transition to a results-only work environment is an example of this.

=== Return on investment ===
The estimated return on investing in ROWE is 1.68, meaning for every dollar invested, the company saves $1.68, including reduced absenteeism, reduced presenteeism, lower medical costs, and reduced voluntary turnover.

ROWE-certified companies tend to reduce real estate costs by decreasing dedicated work spaces for all employees.

=== Post-pandemic ===
Watt Publishing closed its offices during the COVID-19 pandemic in 2020. Once public health conditions allowed them to re-open their office building, CEO Greg Watt did not change any policies or create complex re-entry plans. Watt reported that the company did not experience any kind of employee rebellion from unhappy employees.

Daniel Pink called ROWE the future of work. In his book, Drive, Daniel Pink recognizes Jody Thompson as one of the six business leaders who offer wise guidance for designing organizations that promote autonomy, mastery, and purpose.

== Criticism ==
Less than a year into his job, in which he was tasked with turning around a company considered on the brink of bankruptcy, former CEO Hubert Joly said that Best Buy’s program had given employees too much independence.

CMHC reported that employees spend less time socializing with coworkers at the office and that ROWE focused too much on the individual.

== See also ==
- Commission (remuneration)
- Flat organization
- Holacracy
- Workplace democracy
- Workers' self-management
