= List of English words of Spanish origin =

This is a list of English language words whose origin can be traced to the Spanish language as "Spanish loan words".

== A ==
abaca
via Spanish abacá from Tagalog abaká
abalone
from Spanish abulón, from Ohlone aluan or Rumsen awlun.
adios
from Spanish 'adiós' meaning "goodbye" < latin ad deus "to god" (short for "a Dios seas", "a Dios seades", literally, "may (you) be (commended) to God")
adobe
From Egyptian via Arabic At-tūb (الطّوب)
aficionado
from past participle of aficionar, to inspire affection, from afición affection, from Latin affection-, affectio, from afficere .
albatross
from alcatraz, see below.
Alcalde
from alcalde, magistrate.
Alcatraz
(meaning "gannet") from Arabic غطاس al-ġaţţās ("the diver")
alidade
via French, Spanish alidada and Medieval Latin alhidade from Arabic العهدة al-idada, "the revolving radius"
alligator
from el lagarto, "the lizard" < latín lacartus < lacertus.
alpaca
via Spanish, from Aymara allpaqa
aludel
from Old French alutel, via Spanish and Medieval Latin from Arabic الأثال al-ʾuṯāl, "the sublimation vessel"
amigo
from Spanish and/or Portuguese amigo, "friend"; from Latin amicus meaning "friend," derived from amare (to love).
amole
Mexican Spanish from Nahuatl amolli meaning "soap root."
amontillado
from the village of Montilla "little mount", Province of Córdoba, Spain
ancho
from Mexican Spanish (chile) ancho, "wide (chili)" < latin amplus
anchovy
from Spanish anchoa or more probably Portuguese anchova meaning "bluefish"; from Genoese or Corsican dialect; ultimately from Latin apua meaning "small fish" and Greek Αφυε aphye meaning "small fry" or from Basque anchuva meaning "dry"
Angeleno
from American Spanish
Apache
from Mexican Spanish from Yavapai 'epache meaning "people" or from Zuni apachu meaning "enemy"
armada
"armed [fleet]" from the Spanish navy, La armada española
armadillo
from armadillo, "little armored one"
arroyo
from arroyo, "stream" < arrugium
avocado
alteration of Spanish aguacate, from Nahuatl ahuacatl.
ayahuasca
via Spanish from Quechua ayawaska meaning "soul vine."

== B ==
banana
from Spanish or Portuguese banana, probably from a Wolof word, or from Arabic بأننا “ba’ nana” fingers
bandolier
from Spanish bandolero, meaning "band (for a weapon or other) that crosses from one shoulder to the opposite hip" and bandolero, loosely meaning "he who wears a bandolier"

barbeque
from barbacoa, from Spanish, taken from Caribbean Taínos barbacu, cooking set-up with wood tray at a height over fire
barracuda
from barracuda May have come from barraco, meaning overlapping tooth
barranca
from Spanish barranca or barranco, ravine
barrio
from Spanish barrio, "neighborhood", from Arabic بري barri, wild
bastinado
from bastonada, from Spanish bastón, cane
bodega
from Spanish and/or Portuguese bodega, meaning cellar < latin-greek aphothekam.
bodegón
from bodegón
bolero
from Spanish bolero
bonanza
from bonanza meaning "prosperity" < latin bonantia < bonus "good".
bonito
from Spanish bonito, meaning "beautiful" < latin bonus "good".
breeze
from brisa "cold northeast wind" or from Frisian briesen - to blow (wind)
bronco
from bronco meaning "coarse"
buckaroo
from vaquero meaning "cowboy", ultimately from Latin "vaccarium" "cowboy" (vacca "cow").
burrito
diminutive of burro, a dish originally from Northern Mexico, literally "little donkey"
burro
from burro, "donkey" < latin burricus "pescado".

== C ==
caballero
from Spanish caballero meaning "knight/gentleman", from caballo, "horse", Celtic caballos "horse".
cabana
from Spanish cabaña or Portuguese cabana < latin < capanna; both meaning "cabin"
cacique
from Spanish, from Taíno cacike or Arawak kassequa, both meaning a chief
cafeteria
from cafetería, "coffee store"
calaboose
from Vulgar Latin calafodiuma "to dig a protected place" and Louisiana French calabouse, from Spanish calabozo
caldera
from Spanish caldera meaning "cauldron" from Latin caldaria, "cooking pot."
California
place name first seen in print in 1510 Spanish novel 'Las sergas de Esplandián' by Garci Rodríguez de Montalvo
camarilla
from camarilla, "small room" diminutive of cámara "room" < latin camara.
camino
from camino a path or road, from Celtic cammanos "road".
cannibal
from Spanish caníbal, alteration of caríbal, from Caribe
canoe
from Spanish canoa, from Haitian canaoua
canyon
from cañón with same meaning. Derived from caño, "a pipe, tube, gorge, tube;" ultimately from Latin canna meaning "reed."
carabao
from Spanish from Visayan language kalabaw, from Malay language kerabau.
caramba
from Spanish, meaning "heck"; expression of dread, displeasure, or disapproval, euphemism for carajo
carbonado
from carbonada, from carbón meaning "coal"
cargo
from the verb cargar meaning "to load"
Caribbean
from Spanish Caribe, from name of Carib Indians of the region.
cassava
from cazabe, from Taíno caçábi
caudillo
from caudillo, from Latin capitellium "head" meaning "leader"
cedilla
from cedilla, archaic spelling zedilla (little z)
chaparral
from Spanish, chaparro loosely meaning small evergreen oak, from Basque txapar, "small, short"
chaps
from Mexican Spanish chaparreras, leg protectors for riding through chaparral
chayote
from Spanish, literally: "squash", from Nahuatl chayotl meaning "spiny squash"
chicha
from Spanish chicha, from Guna chichab, meaning "maize" or from Nahuatl chichiatl, "fermented water."
chicle
from chicle "gum", from Nahuatl tzictli "squishy stuff" or Mayan tsicte.
chile
from Spanish chile, from Nahuatl chilli
chipotle
from Spanish, smoked jalapeño, from Nahuatl chilpoctli
chocolate
from Spanish chocolate, from Nahuatl xocolatl meaning "hot water" or from a combination of the Mayan word chocol meaning "hot" and the Nahuatl word atl meaning "water."
Choctaw
from the native name Chahta of unknown meaning but also said to come from Spanish chato (="flattened") because of the tribe's custom of flattening the heads of male infants.
chorizo
from chorizo, "sausage"
churro
from churro, "fritter"
cienega or cienaga
from ciénaga, "swamp" < latin caenus "mud" and native suffix -aka, caénaka.
cigar
from Spanish cigarro meaning "fag (UK), stogie, stogy", from Mayan sicar or sic, "tobacco"
cigarette
from French cigarette "little weed", diminutive of French cigare "stogie", from Spanish cigarro meaning "fag (UK), stogie, stogy."
cilantro
from Spanish cilantro < latin coriandrum, "coriander"
coca
from Spanish, coca meaning "coke", from Quechua kuka
cockroach
from Spanish cucaracha
cocoa or cacao
from Spanish cacao, from Nahuatl cacáhuatl
cojones
from Spanish cojones < latin coleones meaning "balls, testicles", to denote courage
Colorado
from Spanish colorado < latin coloratus, red or colored
comrade
from French camarade meaning "friend", from Spanish camarada < latin camara "room", "pal, mate"
condor
from Spanish, from Quechua kuntur
conquistador
from conquistador meaning "conqueror", from conquista < latin conquisita, "conquest"
coquina
from coquina, dim. form of "concha" meaning seashell; a sedimentary rock of NE Florida
cordillera
from cordillera, "range" < cordel "cord".
corral
from corral meaning "pen, yard" from Portuguese curral meaning "pen" of unknown; perhaps ultimately from Afrikaans kraal or from Vulgar Latin currale loosely meaning "enclosure for vehicles."
corrida
a bullfight (literally: "raced")
coyote
from Spanish coyote, from Nahuatl coyotl
cowboy
from Spanish vaquero, an individual who managed cattle while mounted on horseback, from vaca, "cow", from Latin vacca
creole
from French créole, from Spanish criollo, from Portuguese crioulo, raised in the house
crimson
from Old Spanish cremesín, via Medieval Latin cremesinus from Arabic قيرميزل qirmizI, from Persian قرمز qermez kermes; ultimately from Sanskrit कृमिज krmi-ja meaning "worm-made."
crusade
blend of Middle French croisade and Spanish cruzada; both ultimately from Latin crux, crucis "cross"
cuadrilla
from cuadrilla "group of people" diminutive of cuadro "square" < latin quadrus.
cumbia
from Spanish cumbia, a popular dance (for couples) originating in Colombia.

== D ==
daiquiri
from Daiquiri, a port city in eastern Cuba
dengue
from Spanish dengue meaning "fever", from Swahili dinga, "seizure"
derecho
from Spanish derecho meaning "straight" or "masculine of right side" < latin directum, a widespread and long-lived convection-induced straight-line windstorm
descamisado
from Spanish descamisado, "without a shirt" < camisa "shirt" < celtic kamisia.
desperado
from Spanish desesperado, desperate
doubloon
from Spanish doblón : meaning "two-sided" for two-headed coin ("doble" is double in Spanish < latin duplex).

== E ==
El Dorado
from El Dorado, literally, "the golden one"
El Niño
from El Niño de la Navidad, literally, "the Christmas child" due to the warming of Pacific waters seemed to warm around Christmas
embarcadero
from embarcadero a boat dock, from barca "rowboat".
embargo
from Spanish embargar, to "seize" or "impound" < latin imbarricare.
escabeche
from escabeche, "pickle" < Arabic assukkabáǧ.
escopeteros
from Spanish escopetero, "musketeer", from escopeta "shotgun" < italian schioppetto.

== F ==
Federales
from Federales, "federal police"
fiesta
from the Spanish fiesta meaning "party" < latin festa
Flamenco
"Spanish genre of music and dance typical of the gypsies".
Florida
from La Florida, the flowery or plant-filled place or pascua florida, "flowery Easter."
flotilla
diminutive of flota, "fleet"

== G ==
galleon
from Spanish "galeón" (a large sailing ship having three or more masts, from the 15th to 18th century)
gaucho
from Mapuche "Argentine cowboy"
gracias
from Latin expression gratias agere ("to give thanks")
gringo
Was thought to be from "green go home!" Literally "¡verdes vayanse a casa!", in reference to the invasion of the United States Army to Mexico in 1846 and 1848, since the United States Army wore green uniforms. However, this etymology is largely thought to be false, and "Gringo" was already documented in the Diccionario Castellano of Esteban Terreros y Pando in 1786, so "gringo" has nothing to do with "green go home". The most valid and accepted etymology is a deformation of "griego" that means "greek" in Spanish. The most likely evolution of the word is griego > grigo > gringo
guacamole
via American Spanish from Nahuatl ahuaca-molli ("avocado sauce")
guerrilla
from Spanish obsolete meaning "small war" or current meaning "fire-armed group" (raised out of unbalanced democracy) from guerra "war" < Gothic werra "war" (Spanish pronunciation: [ɡeˈriʎa])

== H ==
habanero
from the Spanish for the name of the Cuban city of La Habana, which is known as Havana in English. Although it is not the place of origin, it was frequently traded there.
hacienda
from Old Spanish facienda, "estate"
hackamore
from Spanish jaquima, "halter."
hola
Spanish greeting, equivalent to "hello"
Hispano
From Spanish hispanic. Also came from Latin Hispania, the whole Iberian peninsula (Spain and Portugal) called by Romans.
hombre
from Spanish hombre, "man" < medieval homre < latin hominis
hoosegow
from Spanish juzgado, courthouse, from juzgar < latin iudicare "to judge"
hurricane
from Spanish huracán, from Taíno hurákan; akin to Arawak kulakani, thunder

== I ==
Inca
via Spanish inca, from Quechua Inka, literally: "lord, king."
incommunicado
from incomunicado, without communication (in the mountains, in the jail,...), "in solitary confinement."
iguana
from Spanish iguana from Arawak iwana.

== J ==
jade
from Spanish piedra de ijada, "stone of flank."
jalapeño
from Spanish, a type of spicy chilli named after Jalapa de Enríquez, a town in Mexico, and the capital of the state of Veracruz
jerky
via Spanish charqui, from Quechua ch'arki, "dried flesh"
junta
from Spanish junta literally "joint"; a board of joint administration; sometimes used to refer to military officers command in a coup d'état. As an adjective, it means "together".

== K ==
key
from Spanish cayo, from Taíno cayo (this is English 'key'/'cay'/'quay' as in an island, reef or a linked series of them, not the 'key' with which one locks/unlocks doors)

== L ==
La Niña
"The little girl", complementary weather pattern to (q.v.) El Niño
lariat
from la reata, meaning "the strap, rein, or rope" from reatar ("to tie again") from atar "to tie (up);" from Latin aparte, "to join."
lasso
via American English from Spanish lazo meaning "tie; or rope" ultimately from Latin laqueum, "noose, snare."
Latino
English short for the Spanish word latinoamericano, formed by latino "related to the Latin empire and language" and americano "from the Americas"
llama
via Spanish llama, from Quechua llama
Llanos
from Spanish llano "plain" < latin planus; vast tropical grassland plain situated to the east of the Andes in Colombia and Venezuela.
loco
from loco, "mad" or "crazy"
Lolita
from the diminutive for Lola, short for Dolores

== M ==
macho
from macho "male, brave" < latin masculus, the property of being overtly masculine. Also used in South America to refer to a male llama or alpaca.
majordomo
via Spanish mayordomo or Italian maggiordomo (both meaning "butler") from Latin maior domus meaning "mayor of the place."
mano
from mano, "hand". Stone handtool
manzanilla
from Spanish manzanilla, a natural tea for some superficial pains. The word is diminutive of manzana "apple"
marijuana
from Spanish marihuana meaning cannabis.
maroon
from the Spanish cimarrón, which was derived from an Arawakan root
matador
from matador meaning "killer" from matar ("to kill") probably from Arabic مات mata meaning "he died", also possibly cognate with Persian مردن mordan, "to die" as well as English "murder." Another theory is that the word "matador" is derived from a combination of the Vulgar Latin mattāre, from Late Latin mactare (to slaughter, kill) and the Latin -tor (which is cognate with Greek τορ -tōr and Sanskrit तर -tar-.)
merengue
a type of music and dance originating in the Dominican Republic
mesa
from mesa, table < latin mensa. The corresponding Spanish word to a flat top mountain is meseta
mescal
from Spanish mezcal, from Nahuatl mexcalli
mesquite
from Mexican Spanish mezquite, from Nahuatl mizquitl
mestizo
from mestizo "racially mixed" < latin mixticius "mixed" or "mongrel", in Spanish, refers to a person of mixed European and Native American descent.
mojito
dim. formed from "mojado" (wet or dripping) probably referring to the mint leaves in the well known Cuban drink
mole
also from Spanish as Guacamole, from Nahuatl molle or molli ("sauce")
Montana
from montaña, a mountain
mosquito
from mosquito, literally "little fly" < mosca "fly" < latin musca.
mulatto
from Spanish or Portuguese mulato meaning "octoroon, sambo" from mulo "mule" > "hybrid". in Spanish, refers to a person of mixed European-African descent.
mustang
from mustango, mestengo, mestencoor mesteño, "without known master or owner" (archaic)
mustee
from mestizo, "racially mixed."or "mongrel"

== N ==
nachos
from Nacho, a nickname for the given name Ignacio, inventor of the snack
nada
from "nada" meaning " nothing."
Negro
from Spanish, Portuguese, or Italian negro, "black", from Latin nigrum (nom. niger) and Greek νέγρος négros, both meaning "black.". In Spanish it might be derogatory (depending on intonation and facial expression on some Latin countries).
Nevada
from Nevada ("snowy") after the Sierra Nevada ("snowy mountains")
nostromo
from nuestro amo, "our master".

== O ==
olé
an interjection, an expression of approval or triumph, similar to the Italian bravo (capable), by spectators of bull fights or football (soccer) matches
oregano
from orégano, "marjoram"

== P ==
pachuco
from pachuco, "fancy-dresser." or "unsuitable or bad-looking attire"
paella
from Spanish paella, from Valencian paella "pan" and the dish name. Originated in Latin patella, also meaning "pan."
palmetto
from palmito, "palm heart, little palm", diminutive form of the word for palm.
pampa
via Spanish, from Quechua pampa, plain
papaya
from papaya, akin to Arawak papáia
páramo
from Spanish páramo (moorland)
patio
from patio, inner courtyard, "an open paved area adjacent to a home"
peccadillo
from pecadillo, "small sin"
peccary
from Spanish pecarí, from Carib pakira or paquira.
peon
from Spanish peón ("laborer")
peyote
from Spanish, from Nahuatl peyotl ("caterpillar")
Philippines
via Spanish Filipinas from Latin Philippinae, "islands of king Philip II of Spain"; ultimately from Greek Φιλιππίναι Philippinai from the Greek phrase Φίλος ίππος Νησιά Fílos Íppos Ni̱sí, "Islands of the Horse Friend."
piccadill
from picadillo, "hash"
pimento or pimiento
from pimiento, "pepper."
piña colada
from Spanish piña (pineapple), and colada, which means strained, from the Spanish verb colar ("to strain")
piñata
from piñata ("jug, pot") from Latin pinea, "pine cone." or "birthday batting-pony game for kids"
piñon or pinyon
from piñón, "pine"
pinta
from pinta, "he/she/it paints"; also archaic Spanish for pintada, "painted"
Pinto
from pintar, "to paint"; a white horse with a coat "painted" in large patterns of any other color.
piragua
from Carib language
pisco
from pisco, "turkey"
placer mining
from placer, "sand bank" or "pleasure"
platinum
from platina, "little silver" (now platino)
playa
from playa, "beach" < latin plagea
plaza
from plaza, "public square, spot or place" < latin platea.
politico
from Spanish or Italian político meaning "politician, political agent;" ultimately from Latin politicus meaning "of citizens or the state, civil, civic," from Greek πολιτικός (Ancient Greek: πολῑτικός) politikos, "of citizens or the state," from πολίτης (plural: πολίτες) polites (citizen) from πόλις polis, "city."
poncho
from poncho, from Araucanian pontho meaning "woolen fabric." or "Short of Proper name Alfonso"
potato
from Peninsular Spanish patata, itself from batata, "sweet potato", from Taíno and papa, "potato" from Quechua
potrero
from potrero, archaic term for "tongue of land"
pronto
from Spanish "soon, prompt"
pronunciamento
from pronunciamiento proclamation, "military coup d'état", usually establishing a military dictatorship (often a junta)
puma
from Spanish "cougar, panther", from Quechua
pueblo
via Castilian pueblo from Latin populus ("people") or "Population of Country-side or outskirts".

== Q ==
quadroon
from cuarterón, "fourth"
quesadilla
from quesadilla meaning a traditional Mexican dish made with tortillas and cheese, diminutive of queso, cheese.
quetzal
from Spanish, from Nahuatl "quetzalli": a group of colourful birds of the trogon family found in tropical regions of the Americas. It also may refer to Guatemalan quetzal, the currency of Guatemala.
quinoa
via Spanish quinua, from Quechua kinwa
quinceañera
from Spanish quince años, literally: "fifteen-year-old-girl"; a girl's fifteenth birthday celebration similar to a "sweet sixteen"; with special rituals in South America.
Quixotism/Quixotic
from fictional character Don Quixote as in "tilting at windmills"
quirt
from Spanish cuarta literally: "quarter"; a short horseman's whip, from "one fourth" (of a vara)

== R ==
ranch
from rancho, a very small rural community, smaller than a town; also a very humble dwelling in South American Spanish.
reconquista
from reconquista, "reconquest"
remuda
from Mexican Spanish remudar, to exchange (horses)
renegade
from renegado, "turncoat, heretic, disowned"
rhumba
from rumba, Spanish for "party" or "spree"
rincon
from rincón, "meadow" or "corner-side"
robalo
from Spanish róbalo meaning "bass, sea wolf," a tropical marine game and fish food
roble
from Spanish roble, "oak tree" < latin roboris.
rodeo
from rodeo and verb rodear (to go around)

rueda
from rueda, wheel or circle
rumba
from rumba, Spanish for "party" or "spree"

== S ==
saguaro
from saguaro, from Piman
salsa
from salsa, "sauce"
sapodilla
from zapotillo
sarabande
from French sarabande in turn from Spanish zarabanda
savanna
from sabana, "veld", from Taíno zabana
savvy
from Spanish or Portuguese sabe, "knows"; sabio, "wise, learned" < latin sapidus "with sapience".
shack
perhaps from Mexican Spanish jacal meaning "hut", from Nahuatl xacalli
sherry
from Old Spanish Xerés [ʃeˈɾes], modern Spanish Jerez [xeˈɾeθ].
sierra
from sierra, a mountain range
Sierra Nevada
literally "snowy mountains"
siesta
from siesta, "nap", from Latin Sexta [hora] "sixth hour"
silo
from silo
sombrero
from sombrero (literally, shade maker), "hat"
stampede
from estampida
stevedore
from estibador (literally, one who stuffs), "ship loader"
stockade
from a French derivation of the Spanish estocada, "stab"
suave
meaning "charming, confident, and elegant" < latin suavis "sweet".

== T ==
taco
from taco, "plug" or from Portugues Bat
tamale
from Spanish tamales, pl. of tamal, from Nahuatl tamalli meaning dumpling made from corn flour
tango
from Spanish tango.
tapioca
from tapioca, "cassava"
ten-gallon hat
from Spanish tan galán meaning "so gallant (looking)"; alternate theory is the gallon of Texas English here is a misunderstanding of galón meaning braid
temblor
Spanish for trembling, or earthquake; from temblar, to shake, from Vulgar Latin *tremulāre, from Latin tremulus
tequila
from tequila, from the town Tequila, where the beverage originated
telenovela or telenovella
from telenovela, "soap opera" or to some extent "TV-drama-show"
tilde
from tilde from Spanish ' symbol above some vowels
tobacco
from Spanish (Nahuatl influenced) tabaco, "snuff"
tomatillo
from Spanish tomatillo, "small tomato" (see Physalis philadelphica)
tomato
from Spanish tomate, from Nahuatl xitomatl
torero
from toro, "bull"
tornado
from Spanish tronada, "thunderstorm", influenced by tornar, "to turn"
tortilla
from tortilla, literally "small cake". In Mexico is a type of thin flatbread made of finely ground wheat flour. Now is called "omelet" in Spain
tostada (toast) and tostada (tortilla)
from tostada, "toasted"
tuna
from Spanish atún, from Arabic تون tun, from Latin thunnus, from Greek θύννος, thynnos (=tuna fish)
turista
from turista, "tourist" as either gender M/F

== V ==
vamoose
from vamos, meaning "let's go"
vanilla
from Spanish vainilla, diminutive of Latin vaina, from vagina meaning "pod"
vaquero
from the Spanish word vaquero
vertigo
from the Spanish word vértigo
vicugna
via Spanish, from Quechua wik'uña
vigilante
from Spanish vigilante, meaning "watchman." < latin vigiliā "sleepless night, vigil".

== W ==
wop
from Italian guappone, from Spanish guapo, "handsome" or "attractive".

== Y ==
yerba buena
from Spanish yerbabuena meaning "good herb" (infused in Tea which has a Mint smell) < latin erbam bonam

== Z ==
Zorro
from Spanish zorro, a fox, originally "smart" (according to the Spanish Royal Academy: from the Portuguese "zorro" 'lazy, idle', derived from "zorrar" 'to drag'; cf. occit. mandra 'zorra'; specifically 'mandria, lazy')

== See also ==
- List of Spanish words of Indigenous American Indian origin
- List of U.S. place names of Spanish origin
- List of English–Spanish interlingual homographs
