= Lola =

Lola may refer to:

== Places ==
- Lola Pass in Shi Yomi district of India in Arunachal Pradesh state
- Lolá, a corregimiento or subdistrict of Panama
- Lola Township, Cherokee County, Kansas, United States
- Lola Prefecture, Guinea
- Lola, Guinea, a town in Lola Prefecture
- Lola Island, in the Solomon Islands

== People ==
- Lola (given name), including people and fictional characters with the name
- Lola (footballer) (born 1950), Brazilian association football player
- Lola (Servant of God) (1913–1999), also named Floripes Dornellas de Jesus, Brazilian Roman Catholic woman

== Film and television ==
- Lola (1961 film), by Jacques Demy
- Lola (1970 film), starring Charles Bronson
- Lola (1974 film), by David Hemmings
- Lola (1986 film), by Bigas Luna
- Lola (1981 film), by Rainer Werner Fassbinder
- Lola (2019 film), by Laurent Micheli
- LOLA (2022 film), by Andrew Legge
- Lola (2024 film), by Nicola Peltz and Bria Vinaite
- Grandmother (2009 film) or Lola, a film by Brillante Mendoza
- Clubbed to Death (film) or Lola, a 1996 French film by Yolande Zauberman
- Lola, a 2001 film by Carl Bessai
- Lola (TV series), a 2008 Greek sitcom
- Lola...Érase una vez, a Mexican telenovela (started 2007)
- Law & Order: LA, or LOLA, a 2010-11 American police and legal TV drama
- Lola Award, the statuette of the German Film Award

== Music ==
- "Lola" (song), a 1970 song by The Kinks
- "Lola" (Iggy Azalea song), 2019
- "Lola", a song by Camila Cabello from the album Familia, 2022
- "Lola", a song by Dana International
- "Lola", a song by Superbus
- "Lola", a song by Mika from The Origin of Love
- Lola, the subject of Barry Manilow's song "Copacabana"
- Lola, a character of the opera Cavalleria rusticana

== Other uses ==
- Tropical Storm Lola, any of various cyclones
- Lola (computing), a hardware-description language
- LoLa (software), a music performance streaming system
- Lola language, spoken in Indonesia
- Lola Cars, a racing car constructor based in England
- MasterCard Lola, a 1997 racing team
- Ladies of Liberty Alliance
- Lola 8, an early Serbian personal computer
- Lola.com, a Boston-based software as a service company
- Lola, water balloons thrown in Nepal during the Holi festival
- Lola, a hawk mated to Pale Male
- Lola, a sweet banana pepper
- Lola (harvestman), a genus of harvestmen in the family Phalangodidae
- Lola, a genus of algae in the family Cladophoraceae, synonym of Rhizoclonium
- Lola (comic strip)

== See also ==
- Run Lola Run, a 1998 German film
- "Whatever Lola Wants", a song from the musical Damn Yankees
- LOLA (disambiguation)
- Dolores (disambiguation), a name of which Lola is a diminutive form
- Lolita (disambiguation), a diminutive form of Lola
