= Dolors =

Dolors is a Catalan feminine given name, a cognate of Dolores.

== People with the name ==
- Dolors Aleu i Riera (1857–1913), Spanish physician
- Dolors Bassa (born 1959), Spanish politician, educator, and educational psychologist
- Dolors Bramon (born 1943), Spanish philologist and historian
- Dolors Lamarca (1943–2026), Spanish-Catalan philologist and librarian
- Dolors Martí Domènech (1901–1970), only woman in Tarragona, Spain, to have a public career and hold a position of political responsibility with the Catalan Republican government.
- Dolors Monserdà (1845–1919), Spanish writer
- Dolors Montserrat (born 1973), Spanish lawyer and politician
- Dolors Prat (1905–2001), Catalan trade unionist
- Dolors Terradas (born 1949), Spanish teacher and politician
- Dolors Vázquez Aznar (1955–2014), Spanish painter
- Dolors Vives Rodon (1909–2007), Spanish aviator

== See also ==
- Dolor (disambiguation)
- Dolours Price (1950–2013), Provisional Irish Republican Army volunteer
