= Rola (name) =

Rola or Roula is a feminine given name and surname of Arabic origin. Notable people with the name include:

== Mononym ==
- Rola (model) stagename of Eri Sato (born 1990), Japanese fashion model of Bangladeshi descent

== Nickname ==
- Rola Chen, stagename of Chen Yi (born 1987), Chinese model and actress who works in Japan

== Given name ==
=== Rola ===
- Rola Badawiya (born 1998), American soccer player
- Rola Bahnam, Lebanese TV presenter of an Iraqi descent
- Rola Dashti (born 1964), Kuwaiti economist, business executive, politician and minister
- Rola El-Halabi (born 1985), professional German boxer of Lebanese origin
- Rola El Haress (born 1983), Lebanese swimmer
- Rola Hallam, British-Syrian consultant anaesthetist, humanitarian, international advocate and speaker
- Rola Hoteit (born 1974), Lebanese airline captain
- Rola Khaled (born 1984), Lebanese Muay Thai practitioner
- Rola Nashef, American director, screenwriter, producer and multimedia artist
- Rola Saad (born 1978), Lebanese pop singer and model
- Rola Saad (producer) (born 1948), Lebanese pan-Arab television personality
- Rola Sleiman (born 1975), Lebanese-Syrian female pastor
- Rola Tabash, Lebanese politician

=== Roula ===
- Roula Hamadeh (born 1961), Lebanese actress
- Roula Khalaf (born 1965), British-Lebanese journalist
- Roula Koromila (born 1957), Greek television and talk show presenter
- Roula Partheniou (born 1977), Canadian contemporary artist

== Surname ==
- Balthasar Klossowski de Rola, known as Balthus (1908–2001), Polish-French modern artist
- Anisa Rola (born 1994), Slovenian football defender
- Blaž Rola (born 1990), Slovenian tennis player
- Michał Rola-Żymierski (1890–1989), Polish Communist leader
- Stanisław Rola (born 1957), Polish race walker

== See also ==
- Lola (given name)
- Rola (disambiguation)
- Rolo (name)
- Rora (name)
- Rula
