= Lalita =

Lalita or Lalitha may refer to:

== Hinduism ==
- Tripura Sundari, or Lalita, a goddess in Shakti centred Hinduism
- Lalita (gopi), a figure in Krishna tradition

== Film ==
- Lalita (1949 film), an Indian folklore Oriya film
- Lalitha (film), a 1976 Tamil film
- Lalita (1984 film), an Indian Bengali film

== People ==
- Lalitha (actress) (1930–1982), Indian actress
- Lalita Babar (born 1989), Indian long-distance runner
- Lalita D. Gupte (fl. from 1971), India banker
- Lalita Iyer (fl. from 2004), Indian writer
- Lalitha Kumaramangalam (born 1958), Indian politician
- Lalitha Kumari (born 1967), Indian film actress
- Lalitha Kumari (pastor) (1942–2013), Indian priest
- Lalita Lajmi (born 1932), Indian painter
- Lalitha Lenin (born 1946), Indian poet
- Lalita Panyopas (born 1971), Thai actress
- Lalita Pawar (1916–1998), Indian actress
- Lalitha Rajapakse (1900–1976), Ceylonese lawyer and politician
- Lalita Ramakrishnan (born 1959), American microbiologist
- Lalitha Ravish (fl. from 2015), Indian politician
- Lalita Sehrawat (born 1994), Indian wrestler
- Lalita Shastri (1910–1993), wife of former Indian prime minister Lal Bahadur Shastri
- Lalitha Sivakumar, Indian Carnatic music teacher and composer
- Lalita Yadav (born 1961), Indian politician
- Lalita Yauhleuskaya (born 1963), Belarusian sports shooter

== Other uses ==
- Lalitha (raga), a Carnatic musical framework

== See also ==
- Lalit (disambiguation)
- Lolita (disambiguation)
- Lalita Gauri Mandir, a temple in Varanasi, India
- Lalita Sahasranama, a Hindu text from the Brahmanda Purana
- Lalitavistara Sūtra, a Mahayana Buddhist scripture
- Lalitha Mahal, a palace in Mysore
- Lalithasree (born 1957), Indian film actress
