= List of Spanish words of Iberian origin =

This is a list of Spanish words which are believed to have originated from the ancient Iberian language. Some of these words existed in Latin as loanwords from other languages. Some of these words have alternative etymologies and may also appear on a list of Spanish words from a different language.

== List ==
- ardilla "squirrel", diminutive of obsolete arda, from harda.
- argaña "ridge of an ear of cereal, weed", from *arganna
- árgoma "heather, furze, broom"; related to argaña
- aro "big metal or wooden ring"; also Portuguese. Perhaps instead from an Indo-European word *aros "circle; wheel" (BDELC).
- arroyo "stream", from LL arrugia "mineshaft" (Pliny the Elder, Naturalis Historia, 33.70), from Iberian meaning "stream, channel"; also Portuguese arroio, Friulian roggia, Italian (Val Gardena) roia, Venetian roza; related to Spanish cuérrago "riverbed".
- artiga "busted sod, tilled earth" (> artigar "to till, bust sod"; DRAE). Also Catalan. Coromines proposed instead: 1) Celtic or Indo-European word akin to Welsh aredig "tillage" or Old High German art "cultivated land". This comparison was already suggested by Hubschmid who related the term with Indo-European verbs such as Latin arare "to plough"; 2) Iberian
- balsa "pond, pool" (also Catalan bassa, Portuguese balseiro). Pre-Roman, probably Iberian (BDELC). (In Basque it is a Spanish loanword).
- barda "boundary hedge, fence, or wall; brush, thorn, or straw covering over pens or orchards"; also Catalan bardissa; also Portuguese; perhaps Iberian (also in [Sardinian language]). (BDELC)
- barro "mud" (also Aragonese bardo, Catalan bard, Portuguese barro), from *bardum; alternatively, from Hispano-Celtic.
- calabaza "pumpkin", from *calapacceu (cf. Catalan carabassa, Portuguese cabaça), from calappacu "lizard, reptile, turtle" (see galápago below).
- cama "bed"; also Portuguese; (Isidore, 7th century) (BDELC, 101), from Iberian.
- caspa "dandruff"; also Catalan; also Portuguese.
- cazurro "rude, unsociable, malicious", formerly "obscene, crass, lewd"; alternatively from Arabic qadur "unsociable, dirty"
- coscojo "kermes oak gall" (also Catalan coscoll "scarlet"), from Latin cusculius, from Iberian.
- cuérrago "riverbed"; also Portuguese córrego and corgo, from Late Latin corrugus "canal, water conduit in a mine", from Iberian; related to arroyo.
- galápago "tortoise" (also Catalan calàpat "toad"), from *calappacu.
- gándara "low wasteland, wilderness", from Late Latin gangadia.
- garabato "pothook; squiggle"
- garduña "marten"; also Portuguese gardunho
- garma "scree, steep mountain slope"
- gazapo "young rabbit" (also Portuguese caçapo)
- gordo "fat", from Latin gurdus "thick, heavy, clumsy, awkward" (Quintilian, a.d. 35-100, Institutio Oratoria 1.5.57, used for stolidus "stupid"); also Portuguese, French gourd "numb, stiff', Italian dialects.
- gusano (var. gusarapo) "worm" (rivaled by inherited Sp verme)
- manteca "lard" (Pg manteiga, Cat mantega), from *manteica. Corominas suggests an Indo-European origin.
- maraña "thicket"
- marueco, morueco "(uncastrated) ram" (also Catalan marrà, mardà), from *mard-.
- parra "grapevine, trellis" (also Catalan/Portuguese parra, Occitan parran); Corominas (BDELC) gives Gothic parra, -ans "surrounded, encircled", Middle English parren 'to confine, shut in', parrok 'enclosed pasture, paddock', Old English pearruc 'fence, enclosure, enclosed land', Old High German pfarrih, pferrih 'fold, pen, enclosure, hurdle, barrier, bounds, stall' (Modern German Pferch)
- perro "dog", originally "cur"; ousted Old Spanish can
- rebeco "ibex", from older rebezo (1475), robezo (1434), from Old Spanish ueko, from Late Latin hybicum, from Latin ibex, -icis, from Iberian, with influence from Old Spanish reves(s)o "cantankerous, not broken in, untamed".
- sima "chasm"; Coromines considers to be dubious the comparison with some Indo-European words with meanings as "frontier" or "cord".
- sobaco "underarm, armpit" (also Portuguese sovaco)
- tamo "chaff"
- urraca "magpie" (BDELC p. 564); alternatively from Hispano-Celtic *vracca "crone"; cf. Old Irish fracc "woman", Breton gwrac'h "old woman, crone", Cornish gwragh "crone, witch", Welsh gwrach "id."; derivative of *vraci: Br gwreg "woman", C gwrêk, W gwraig.

== See also ==
- Linguistic history of Spanish
- List of Spanish words of Basque origin
- List of English words of Spanish origin
