= Maria Dolores =

María Dolores is short for La Virgen María de los Dolores (Our Lady of Sorrows) in Spanish.

María or Maria Dolores may also refer to:

== People ==
- Maria Dolores Acevedo (1932-1998), Spanish writer
- María Dolores Agüero (born 1982), Honduran politician
- María Dolores Aguilar (born 1958), Spanish entrepreneur and politician
- Maria Dolores Bargues Castelló, Spanish parasitologist
- María Dolores Bedoya (1783–1853), Guatemalan activist
- María Dolores Campana (born 1975), Ecuadorean tennis player
- María Dolores Castellón Vargas (1936–2016), Spanish singer
- María Dolores de Cospedal (born 1965), Spanish politician
- María Dolores Dancausa (born 1959), Spanish executive
- María Dolores Dueñas Navarro (born 1971), Spanish actress
- María Dolores Forner Toro (born 1960), Spanish actress
- María Dolores Izaguirre de Ruiz (1891–1979), Mexican First Lady
- María Dolores Katarain (1954–1986), Basque separatist leader
- María Dolores Malumbres (1931–2019), Spanish pianist, music educator and composer
- María Dolores Molina (born 1966), Guatemalan cyclist
- María Dolores Ortega Tzitzihua (born 1956), Mexican politician
- María Dolores Pradera (1924–2018), Spanish singer and actress
- María Dolores Pulido (born 1974), Spanish long-distance runner
- María Dolores del Río (born 1960), Mexican politician
- María Dolores Rodríguez Sopeña (1848–1918), Spanish Catholic nun
- María Dolores Soria Mayor (1948–2004), Spanish paleontologist
- María Dolores Tarrero-Serrano (1924–2010), Cuban First Lady

== Arts, entertainment, and media ==
- María Dolores, a 1953 Spanish drama film
- "Maria Dolores", a song by Joan Baez in her 1971 album Blessed Are...

== Transport ==
- María Dolores Airport, an airport in Chile
- MV Maria Dolores, a 2006 high-speed catamaran ferry

== See also ==
- Maria (disambiguation)
- Dolores (disambiguation)
