= Dolores =

Dolores, Spanish for "pain; grief", most commonly refers to:

- Our Lady of Sorrows or La Virgen María de los Dolores
- Dolores (given name), including list of people and fictional characters with the name

Dolores may also refer to:

== Film ==
- Dolores (2017 film), an American documentary by Peter Bratt
- Dolores (2018 film), an Argentine film

== Literature ==
- "Dolores (Notre-Dame des Sept Douleurs)", a poem by A. C. Swinburne
- Dolores (Susann novel), a 1976 novel by Jacqueline Susann
- Dolores, a 1911 novel by Ivy Compton-Burnett

== Music ==
- Dolores Recordings, a record label
- Dolores (album), an album by Bohren & der Club of Gore
- "Dolores" (song), a 1940 song written by Frank Loesser and Louis Alter and popularized by Bing Crosby
- "Dolores", a song by the Mavericks from Trampoline
- Dolorès, a waltz written by Émile Waldteufel

== Places ==
- 1277 Dolores, an asteroid

=== Argentina ===
- Dolores, Buenos Aires

=== Belize ===
- Dolores, Belize, a village in Toledo District
- Rancho Dolores, a village in Belize District

=== Colombia ===
- Dolores, Tolima

=== Cuba ===
- Dolores, Caibarién

=== El Salvador ===
- Dolores, Cabañas

=== Guatemala ===
- Dolores, El Petén

=== Mexico ===
- Dolores Hidalgo, a town in Guanajuato
- Misión Nuestra Señora de los Dolores del Sur Chillá, Baja California Sur, often shortened to "Dolores"
- Dolores mine, Chihuahua

=== Nicaragua ===
- Dolores, Nicaragua

=== Philippines ===
- Dolores, Abra
- Dolores, Eastern Samar
- Dolores, Quezon

=== Spain ===
- Dolores, Alicante

=== United States ===
- Dolores, Colorado
- Dolores County, Colorado
- Dolores River, a tributary of the Colorado River, in the U.S. states of Colorado and Utah
- Mission San Francisco de Asís, in San Francisco, also known as "Mission Dolores"

=== Uruguay ===
- Dolores, Uruguay, a city in Soriano Department

== Other uses ==
- Dolores (Ziegfeld girl), Kathleen Mary Rose (1893–1975), English model and showgirl
- Dolores (artists' model), English artists' model
- Dolores, the protagonist Mecha from Z.O.E. Dolores, I

== See also ==
- Lola (given name), a diminutive form of Dolores
- Lolita (given name), a diminutive form of Lola
- Tropical Storm Dolores, a list of storms
