= Rolo (disambiguation) =

Rolo is a type of confectionery.

Rolo may also refer to:

- Rolo (name)
- Rolo, Emilia-Romagna, town in Italy
- Rolo Banca, a defunct subsidiary of UniCredit
- Robotic Lunar Observatory
- Rolo, a predecessor of HyperCard
- Rolo, a demonym for a Bogotano

== See also ==
- Rola bola; also known as a "rolo bolo"
- Roll-on/lift-off vessels; see Roll-on/roll-off#RoLo
- Rollo (disambiguation)
