= List of Odia films of the 1940s =

A list of films produced by the Ollywood film industry based in Bhubaneswar in the 1940s:

| Title | Director | Cast | Genre | Notes |
|---|---|---|---|---|
1949
| Lalita | Kalyan Gupta | Lokanath & Uma | Romance | It was the first Oriya film post Independence and Second Oriya Film |
