= Lola (given name) =

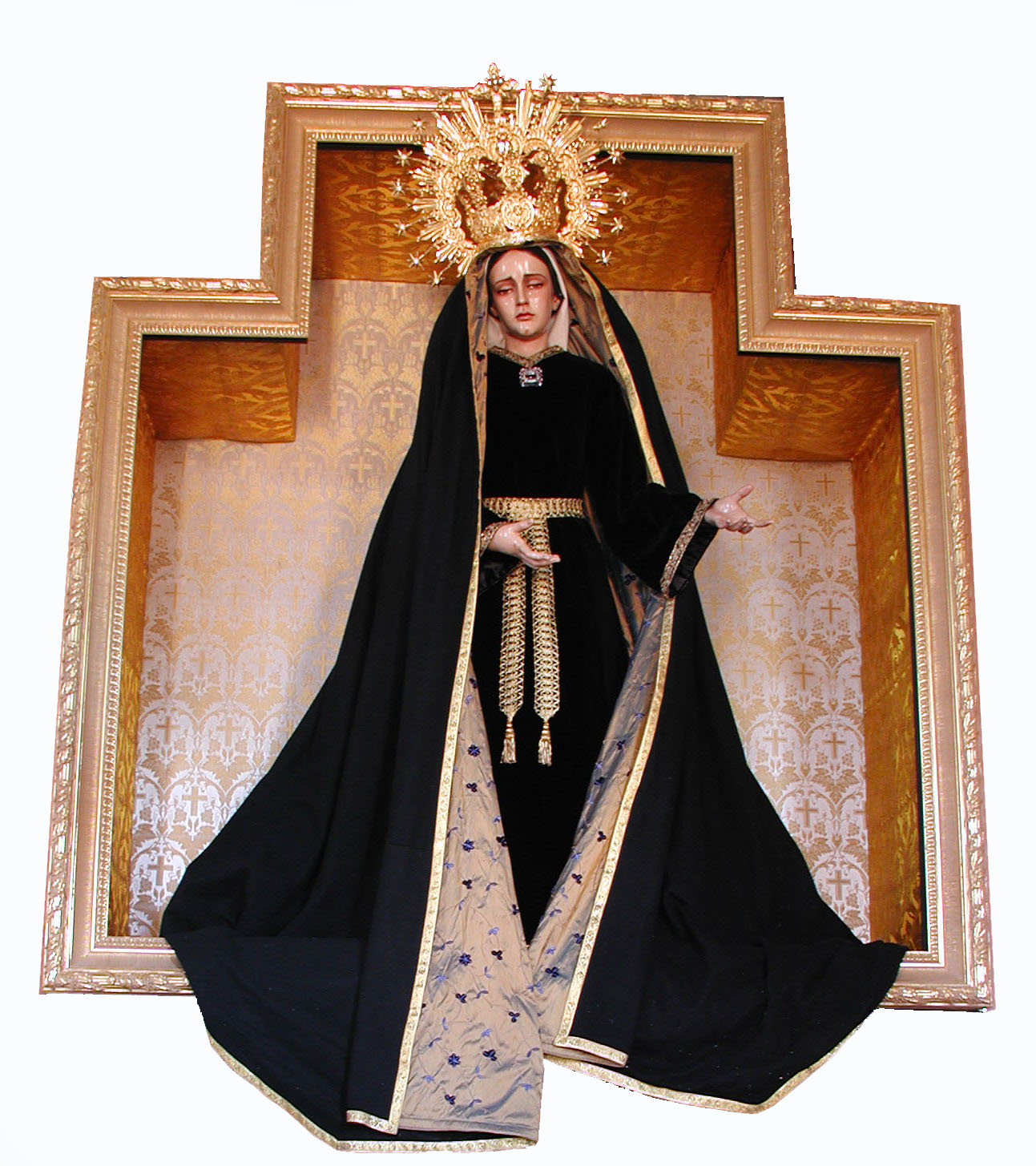
- A statue of Our Lady of Sorrows, the title for the Virgin Mary from which the name Lola is derived.
- Gender: Female

Origin
- Origin: Spanish short form of Dolores and German short form of Aloisia
- Meaning: "sorrows"
- Region of origin: Spain

Other names
- Related names: Dolores, Lolita, Aloisia

Lola is a feminine given name and nickname in the Romance languages, and other language groups.

It is a hypocoristic form of the Spanish name Dolores, meaning "sorrows", taken from one of the titles of the Virgin Mary: Nuestra Señora de los Dolores, or Our Lady of Sorrows.

The term Lola is used as an affectionate or honorific term for an elderly woman (a grandmother) in the Philippines. (Synonyms include; lola, impo, lelang, mamang). This is used coinciding with the male honorific of Lolo (Syn.; lolo, apo, lelong, tatang).

Lola is also a short form of the unrelated German name Aloisia.

The name Lola is also common in Africa; in Nigeria, many feminine Yoruba names are shortened to Lola, such as Temilola, Omolola, Loletha or Damilola.

Lola (Tajik for tulip) is also a feminine name in Uzbekistan, Tajikistan, and Afghanistan. It is derived from the Persian لاله or lâleh.

Lola is also used as a short form of the name Karolina, which was especially popular in use in the 1920s in Poland and is still used. It is also a form of Carol and Charlotte.

Though the name originated with a title for Mary, mother of Jesus Christ, Lola has also acquired a number of contrasting sensual associations. American authors Pamela Redmond Satran and Linda Rosenkrantz noted in their 2008 book Cool Names for Babies that the name has a sultry image and that people associate the name with the song "Whatever Lola Wants, Lola Gets" from the musical Damn Yankees, in which the character of Lola is the Devil's "best homewrecker". The name also has associations with the Irish-born Lola Montez, who became famous in the nineteenth century as an actress, Spanish dancer, courtesan and mistress of King Ludwig I of Bavaria.

Lolita is a Spanish diminutive form of Lola. The name is sometimes used as a term to indicate a sexually precocious girl, due to its association with the title character of Vladimir Nabokov's 1955 novel Lolita and its film adaptations in 1962 and 1997. The name's sexually charged image in certain countries is also due to associations with "Lola", a 1970 song by The Kinks about a young man's encounter with a transvestite named Lola.

The title character in the 1998 German feature film Run Lola Run may also have raised the name's profile, as has Lola, a clever and inquisitive child character in a recently published series of children's picture books by Lauren Child.

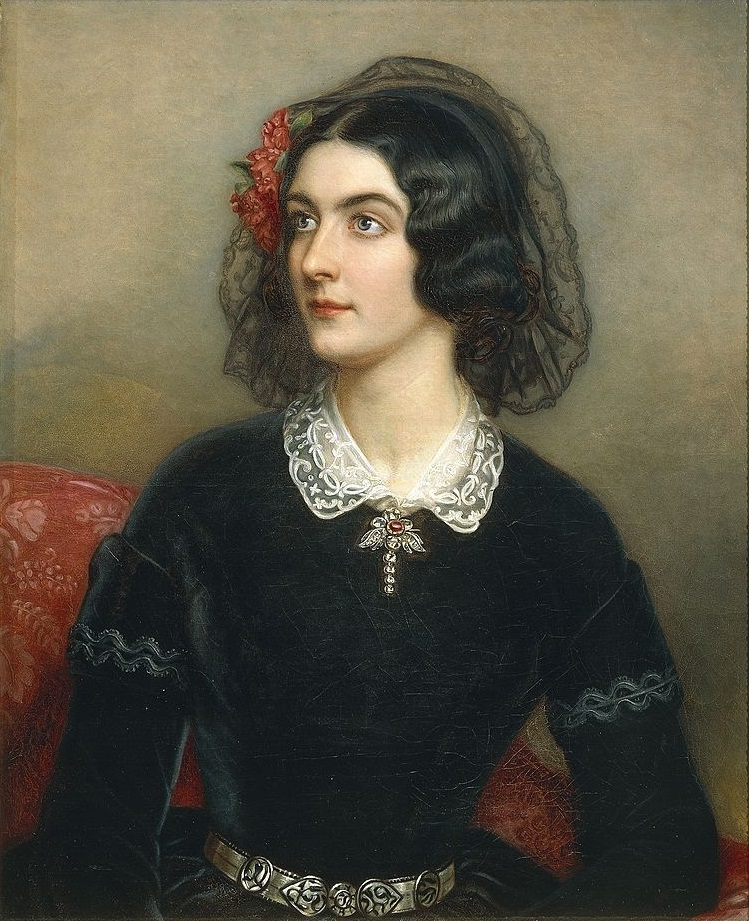
Lola Montez, Irish-born actress, dancer, courtesan, and mistress of a king. She is the subject of this 1847 portrait by Joseph Karl Stieler

Names beginning with or containing the letter L have also been particularly fashionable for girls.

== People named Lola ==
- Lola Albright (1924–2017), American singer and actress
- Lola Almudevar (1978–2007), British journalist and news reporter
- Lola Álvarez Bravo (1903–1993), Mexican photographer
- Dolors Lola Anglada (1893–1984), Spanish writer and illustrator
- Lola Astanova (born 1982), Russian-born classical pianist
- Lola Badia (born 1951), Spanish philologist, medievalist
- Lola Beeth (1861–1940), Austrian soprano opera singer
- María Lucila Lola Beltrán (1932–1996), Mexican ranchera singer
- Lola Berthet (born 1977), Argentine actress
- Lola Blue (born 2005), English actress
- Lola Bobesco (1921–2003), Belgian violinist
- Lola Braccini, born Camilla Cariddi (1889–1969), Italian actress
- Lola Brooke, American rapper
- Lolah Burford (1931–2002), American author
- Carola Lola Costa, (1903–2004), English painter, writer and poet
- Lola Cotton (1892–1975), American vaudeville hypnotist and mentalist of the early 20th century
- Lola Daviet (died 2022), French murder victim
- María Dolores Lola Dueñas (born 1971), Spanish actress
- Lola Beer Ebner, born Carola Zwillinger (1910–1997), Israeli fashion designer
- Lola Flanery (born 2005), Canadian actress
- Loletha Elayne Lola Falana (born 1942), American dancer and actress
- María Dolores Lola Flores (1923–1995), Spanish singer, dancer, and actress
- Lola Forner (born 1960), also known as María Dolores Forner Toro, Spanish actress
- Dolores Lola Gaos (1921–1993), Spanish actress
- Lola Glaudini (born 1971), American actress
- Lola Graham (1918–1992), Australian musician
- Lola Estelle Avinger Haggard (1884–1977), American clubwoman
- Giulia Lola Stabile, known simply as Giulia Stabile (born 2002), Spanish-Italian dancer and television presenter
- María Dolores Lola Herrera (born 1935), Spanish actress
- Lola Lane, born Dorothy Mullican (1906–1981) American actress
- Lola J. May (1923–2007), American mathematics educator, author and consultant
- Lola Lemire Tostevin (born 1937), Canadian poet and novelist
- Lola McEvoy, British politician
- LoLa Monroe born Fershgenet Melaku (born 1986), Ethiopian-born hip hop model
- Lola Martinez (broadcaster), news broadcaster
- Lola Monaghan, Australian burlesque dancer under the stage name Lola the Vamp
- Dolores Candelaria Lola Mora (1866–1936), Argentine sculptor
- Lola Muñoz, Spanish singer
- Lola Nicon (born 1999), French model
- Zorana Lola Novaković (1935–2016), Serbian writer
- Lola Pagnani (born 1972), Italian actress
- Lola Petticrew (born 1995), Northern Ireland actress
- Lola Radivojevic (born 2005), Serbian tennis player
- Rose Emily Lola Ridge (1873–1941), Irish-born New Zealand-American anarchist and modernist poet, and editor of Marxist publications
- Lola Rodríguez de Tió (1843–1924), Puerto Rican poet
- Lola Solar (1904–1989), Austrian teacher and politician
- Lola Todd (1904–1995), American actress
- Lola Tung (born 2002), American actress
- Lola Van Wagenen (born 1938), American historian consumer advocate
- Lola N. Vassall (1906–2002), Jamaican-American physician
- Lola Young (born 2001), British singer
- Margaret Omolola Lola Young, Baroness Young of Hornsey (born 1951), British artist, writer, and peer

== Fictional characters ==
=== Films ===
- Lola, in the 1958 film, Damn Yankees!
- Lola, the title character of Lola, a 1961 French film
- Lola, the title character of Lola, a 2024 American film
- Lola, a character in Shark Tale
- Lola, the title character of Run Lola Run, a 1998 German film
- Lola Lola, a dancer played by Marlene Dietrich in the 1930 German tragicomedic film The Blue Angel
- Lola, the name of the titular character of Rainer Werner Fassbinder's 1981 film Lola
- Lola Alvarez, character in the 2022 Netflix film A Perfect Pairing, also played by Victoria Justice
- Lola Lovell, the name of Kylie Minogue's character in the 1989 film The Delinquents
- Lola Perez, character from the 2016 remake of Adventures in Babysitting
- Lola Scott, character from the 2008 Disney Channel film Camp Rock

=== Television ===
- Lola Bunny, a character from the Looney Tunes franchise
- Lola, in later Plaza Sésamo television series
- Lola Caricola, character in animated series CatDog
- Lola Paxton, character in sitcom series in South Park
- LOLA, the name of Agent Phil Coulson's car in Agents of S.H.I.E.L.D.
- Lola, character in the novel Atonement
- Lola, character in American television series Reign
- Lola Luftnagle, alter ego of the character Lilly Truscott on the Disney TV series Hannah Montana
- Lola Mbola, main character and African-American girl in Robotboy
- Lola, a character on the Spanish television series Lola & Virginia
- Lola, a sketch comedy character played by Catherine O'Hara on SCTV
- Lola, main character in telenovela Lola...Erase una vez
- Lola Boa, character in American animated television series Brandy & Mr. Whiskers
- Lola Rhodes, Charlotte Rhodes character on Gossip Girl (season 5 & 6)
- Lola Skumpy, a character from the American animated television series Big Mouth
- Lola Spratt, in American black comedy television series and web series Childrens Hospital
- Lola Sonner, one of the protagonists in Charlie and Lola
- Lola Loud, a character from the American animated television series The Loud House
- Lola Martinez, character in American comedy-drama television series Zoey 101
- Lola, a character in the animated television series Deer Squad
- Lola, a character in the animated television series Pat the Dog
- Lola, character in the Canadian animated series Lili & Lola
- Lola Argento, character in the brazilian telenovela Scars of Beauty

=== Literature ===
- Lola Lola, the infamous seductress of Heinrich Mann's novel Professor Unrat
- Lola Sonner, one of the main characters from children's book Charlie and Lola
- Lola Limekiller, a minor character in the comic strip Bloom County
- Lola Cep, character in the novel Confessions of a Teenage Drama Queen and its film adaptation played by Lindsay Lohan
- Lola, a character in Graham Greene's 1937 short story "The Innocent"
- Lola Osborne, in the 1900 novel Sister Carrie

=== Music ===
- Lola, the subject of The Kinks' 1970 single "Lola"
- Lola, the main character in the Barry Manilow song, "Copacabana".
- In 2009, Jennifer Lopez released, "Fresh Out The Oven", a promotional single for her upcoming album, Love?. This song featured a persona or character named 'Lola'.
- Lola, the mascot of Gerard Way, derived from the album Hesitant Alien

=== Musicals ===
- Lola, in the Broadway musical comedy Damn Yankees
- Lola, in the Broadway musical Kinky Boots

=== Others ===
- Lola "La Trailera" (Lola "The Truck Driver"), a fictional character for Mexican actress Rosa Gloria Chagoyán that made her a Mexican action and low-budget films actress in the 1970s
- Lola Rembrite, a dateable character in the dating simulation videogame HuniePop
- Lola Pop, a candy-themed clown with the power of body inflation from Nintendo's Arms
- Lola and Carla, two characters from Sega's Joypolis

=== Video game ===
Lola, a character in MOBA video game Brawl Stars

== See also ==
- Lola (disambiguation)
- Lala (disambiguation)
- Lota (name)
- Rola (name)
