= Dolor =

Dolor may refer to:

- The unit of measurement in utilitarianism, see Felicific calculus#Hedons and dolors
- Dolor (sculpture), a work by Clemente Islas Allende in Mexico City

== See also ==
- Dolors, a given name
