= Rolla =

Rolla is an Italian surname and also a diminutive for the Toyota Corolla.

Rolla may refer to:

== People ==
=== Surname ===
- Alessandro Rolla (1757–1841), Italian composer, violin and viola virtuoso
- Antonio Rolla (1798–1837), Italian composer, violin and viola virtuoso

=== Given name ===
- Rolla Anderson (1920–2018), American former football and basketball player and coach
- Rolla Daringer (1888–1974), American baseball shortstop
- Rolla Dyer (1886–1971), American physician
- Rolla Mapel (1890–1966), American baseball pitcher
- Rolla C. McMillen (1880–1961), American politician from Illinois
- Rolla Norman (1889–1971), French actor
- Rolla Wells (1856–1944), American politician from Missouri

== Places ==
United States

- Rolla, Kansas
- Rolla, Missouri
  - Missouri University of Science and Technology, formerly the University of Missouri–Rolla
- Rolla, North Dakota

Canada

- Rolla, British Columbia

Norway

- Rolla (Troms), an island in Troms county, in the municipality of Ibestad

United Arab Emirates

- Rolla, an area within Sharjah (emirate)

India

- Rolla, Anantapur, a village and mandal in Andhra Pradesh

== Other uses ==
- Rolla (ship), name of multiple ships
- "Rolla", a poem by Alfred de Musset
- Rolla, a painting by Henri Gervex

== See also ==
- Rolla Township (disambiguation)
- Rollo (disambiguation)
