= Rola =

Rola may refer to:

- Rola (name)
- Rola coat of arms, a Polish coat of arms
- RoLa, an abbreviation of Rollende Landstrasse (English Rolling highway – a form of transport in which freight trains carry road trucks)
- Rola Cola, a carbonated soft drink created by Carlo Dini in 1979
- Rola (model), Japanese fashion model

== See also ==
- Rolla (disambiguation)
- Rola bola
