= Lalit =

Lalit may refer to:

- Lalit party, a left political party in Mauritius
- Lalit (raga), a raga in Indian classical music
- Lalit Suri, an Indian politician
- Lalit Surajmal Kanodia, an Indian business entrepreneur

== See also ==
- Jatin–Lalit, a Bollywood film composer duo
- Rag Lalit, 1989 album by Ram Narayan
- Lalith, a name
- Lalita (disambiguation)
