= List of Spanish words of Basque origin =

This is a list of Spanish words which are considered to be of Basque origin. Some of these words existed in Latin as loanwords from other languages. Some of these words have alternate etymologies and may also appear on a list of Spanish words from a different language.

== List ==
- abarca "sandal" (cf. Basque abarka < abar "branch", because they were originally made of branches). The word was loaned in Mozarabic and even in Arab pargha/bargha and from here to Spanish alpargata (Trask 2008, 74).
- abertzale / aberzale "Basque patriot, Basque nationalist" (cf. Basque abertzale). Recent loanword as it is a Basque neologism from the 19th century.
- agur "goodbye" (from Basque agur with the same meaning) (DRAE).
- aizcolari (cf. Basque aizkolari). Recent loanword.
- alud "avalanche (of snow)", from Basque elurte or uholde, olde "flood; avalanche" (Joan Corominas; DRAE); elurte is a blend of elur "snow" and lurte "landslide" (see lurte below).
- angula "elver (juvenile eel)", from Basque angula, from Lat anguilla "eel" (DRAE)
- aquelarre "witches' sabbath" (cf. Basque akelarre "goat field", fr. larre "field" and aker "billy goat")
- ardite "money of little value", fr. Basque dial. (Zuberoa) ardít "farthing", fr. Gascon (h)ardit, fr. English farthing (Monlau, Coromines).
- ascua "embers" (cf. Basque askuo, askua, fr. hauts "cinder")
- azcona "dart" (cf. Basque azkon "dart, javelin") (DRAE)
- barranco "ravine, deep gorge" (also Catalan barranc "cavity carved into rock by flowing water", Gascon/Occitan barenc "chasm"), from Basque barneko, barrenko "deep down, deep inside", from barren, barne "bottom, inside (noun)", superlatives of barru "inside, interior" (adj.).
- batúa (modern loanword from Basque)
- becerro "yearling calf", fr OSp bezerro "bullock" (cf. Basque bet- "cow" (combining form of behi) + -irru). Alternatively, Coromines (BDELC, 71) has OSp bezerro from *ibicirru, fr ibex, ibicis "mountain goat", although this is semantically and phonetically dubious (compare rebeco below).
- boina "beret". Modern (19th century) loanword from Basque. For the Basque word Coromines and Pascual (Trask 2008, 146) propose it came from Romance, from LL abonnis, obbonis "bandana, cap", supposedly from Gothic *obbundi, compound of *obe "above" and *bundi (cf. Old Saxon gibund "bundle").
- bruces, caer de "headlong, to fall". Uncertain. According to Coromines the original was "de buzos" / "de buces", which may be related with "bozo" (cf. "bozal"), which may come from Lat. bocca (through an hypothetical Romance *bucciu).
- cachorro "puppy" (metathesis of *chacorro < Basque txakur "whelp"); also Southern Corsican ghjacaru 'dog', Sardinian giagaru 'dog, hound'. Ousted now dialectal (rural Huesca) cadillo 'puppy', but in standard Spanish only having the sense of "bur-parsley".
- calimotxo "a type of punch (drink)". Recent loanword
- carrasca "kermes oak" (also Gascon charrascle, charruscle "thunderclap", charrasclino "rattle"), from Basque karraska "thunder, crash of falling tree" (BDELC).
- cencerro "cowbell" (cf. Basque zintzarri, zintzerri "cowbell, sheep bell")
- chabola "shack" (cf. Basque txabola < Occitan gabiòla; DRAE)
- chacolí, type of basque wine. Recent loanword
- chamorro "close-cropped" (cf. Basque txamorro "grub, subterranean bug or worm" or samur, xamur "tender, delicate")
- chaparro "dwarf oak" (cf. Basque txapar)
- chaparrón 'short downpour'. (Probably neither a pre-Roman word, nor a Basque loanword, but according to the DRAE it is an onomatopoeia; while Coromines believes that even Basque zaparr is an onomatopoeia).
- chapela, type of basque cap. Recent loanword (The Basque word is of Romance origin from Med. Latin capella).
- charro "crude", charrán "rogue, scamp" (cf. Basque txar "bad, faulty"; also Gascon charre "ignorant, naughty")
- chasco 'embarrassing disappointment'. Dubious. Coromines concludes that it is an onomatopoeia.
- chatarra "scrap iron" (cf. Basque txatarra "the old one")
- chirimbolo "circular slice" (cf. Basque txirimbol)
- chirimiri (also 'sirimiri') "drizzle", from Basque zirimiri.
- chistera "top hat", from Basque txistera, from Latin cistella "little basket, fish basket".
- chorro "jet, stream, gushing" (also Portuguese jorro, Old Gascon chourre "fountain"), from Basque txurru "torrent, waterway"
- churre "thick grease" (cf. Basque txur "miserly, economical")
- cococha "cod's chin" (Basque kokotxa)
- conejo "rabbit", from Lat cuniculus, from Proto-Basque *(H)unči (modern untxi); alternatively, from Hispano-Celtic *cun-icos 'little dog'
- ertzaina, "basque policeman", ertzaintza, "basque police". Recent loanwords.
- farra "loud party" (also Catalan parranda) (cf. Basque farra, farre ~ parra, parre "laugh") (BDELC).
- gabarra (cf. Basque kabarra, fr. Latin carabus, fr. Gk kárabos)
- gamarra "halter" (from Basque gamarra)
- ganzúa "lockpick" (Basque gantzua)
- garrapata "tick" (cf. Basque gapar, kapar "furze, gorse"); also Gascon gaparra "furze/gorse grove", Catalan paparra "tick, lice; licebane, stavesacre (plant)", Portuguese carrapato "tick", Aragonese caparra "tick"
- guijarro "pebble" (perhaps Basque gisuarri "limestone"). Or rather a tautological compound made of Sp guija "pebble, small stone" + Basque arri "pebble, stone", from Old Spanish (1495) aguija, from Latin (petra) aquīlea, fem. of aquileus, also seen in aguijada "goad" < *aquīleāta) (Corominas, DLAE).
- ikastola, "Basque language school". Recent loanword
- izquierdo, -a "left" (cf. Basque ezkerda "the left (one, side)", fr ezker "left"; also Portuguese esquerdo, Catalan esquerre). Ousted Old Spanish siniestro (also Old Portuguese sẽestro), from Latin sinister.
- jorguín "sorcerer" (from Basque sorgin "witch")
- laya "spade" (from Basque laia)
- legaña 'eye rheum, eye sleep', fr OSp lagaña (cf. Basque lakaiña "cord, roughness, knob on a tree", formerly "strand")
- lurte "avalanche" (Huesca dialect, from Aragonese lurte, from Basque lurte "landslide", from lur "earth").
- madroño "strawberry tree" (also Aragonese martuel, Catalan maduixa), from Basque mart-, as in martotx "bramble", martsuka ~ martuts ~ martuza "blackberry". For similar development, compare Galician amorogo, Portuguese morango "strawberry", both from amora "blackberry; bramble". Ousted dialectal (a)borto, from OSp alborço, from Lat arbuteus
- mochil, -a (from Basque mutxil, diminutive of mutil "boy")
- mogote "isolated mound" (cf. Basque mokor "mound", moko "beak, point")
- moño "bun, topknot", muñón "stump", muñeca "wrist", all from *mūnn- "lump, bump" (cf. Basqe mun, munho "hill; breast")
- morena "stack of harvested grain" (cf. Basque muru "heap")
- muérdago "mistletoe", fr. OSp mordago (10th century), from *muir-tako (Coromines) (cf. Basque miur(a) "mistletoe", mihuri "seed, kernel"). Inherited visco only has the meaning "birdlime".
- narria "sledge" (cf. Basque nar, narra "towing, sled")
- nava "marshy valley, treeless plain" (cf. Basque naba)
- órdago "Mus card game expression pronounced when you win" (cf. Basque or dago "there it is")
- parranda "party, shindig, jamboree" from Basque farra/parra "laugh"
- pelotari, "player of Pelota". Recent loanword
- pestaña "eyelash" (also Pg pestana, Cat pestanya), from *pistanna, from Proto-Basque *pist- (cf. Basque pizta "rheum", piztule "eyelash")
- pitarra, pitaña "rheum" (cf. Basque pitar "rheum")
- pizarra "slate"; problematic. Many attempts to explain as of Basque origin, but as Trask points the related Basque word seems better explained as a foreign loanword in Basque (cf. Basque pizar "fragment"). Alternative attempts (Coromines BDELC 435) point to a reinterpretation of lapitz-arri (Basque lapits "slate" from Latin lapis, plus Basque arri "stone"), and misdivided as "la-pitzarri" according to the Spanish article la.
- sapo "toad" (also Gascon sapou, Aragonese zapo, Asturian sapu; cf. Basque zapo, apo). Rivals inherited escuerzo, from Lat scorteus "rough surface".
- sarna "scabies", from Medieval Latin (7th century, Isidore of Seville, Origines, 4.8.68), but as serna attested in Theodorus Priscianus (Constantinople, 4th century). Trumper, however, after studying the variants of the word in the Latin medical treatises, proposes a Hispano-Celtic origin; cf. Middle Welsh sarn "mess" and sarnaf "to wreck".
- sarro "tooth plaque" (cf. Basque sarra "rust") (Coromines, BDELC); however, DRAE derives it from Latin saburra "grit, sand", despite the fact this word actually gave sorra.
- silo "cave, granary pit" (cf. Basque zilo, zulo "hole" < Proto-Basque *süɫɦo); or, less likely, from Hispano-Celtic *silon "seed" (Coromines).
- sirimiri, see chirimiri.
- socarrar "to scorch" (cf. Basque dial. and arch. sukarr(a) "flames, fire", fr. su "fire" and karr(a) "flame"
- soca-tira, "tug-of-war". Recent loanword, from Basque soka "rope" + Fr tirer "to pull".
- toca "headdress", perhaps from *tauca.
- vega "river-plain; water meadow", from OSp vayca (Trask 1997, 420), from Basque (i)bai "river" + relational suffix -ko (BDELC).
- zamarra/chamarra "sheepskin jacket" (cf. Basque zamar "fleece")
- zanca "bird leg, slim leg", zanco "stilt" (cf. Basque zanko, zango "leg"). Despite similarity with Italian zanca, the latter is from Lombardic zanka "tong" (cf. German Zange, English tong).
- zarrio "gaudy, garish" (cf. Basque txar "bad, faulty"), Andalusian doublet of charro (see above; DRAE).
- zarza "bramble", fr OSp çarça (mod. Portuguese sarça), fr early Basque (Oihenart; 17th century) çarzi (modern sasi "bramble", sarri "bush, thicket") (Trask 1997, 421). Ousted Old Spanish rubo, from Lat rubus.
- zatico/zatillo "piece of bread" (cf. Basque zati)
- zorra "fox", from Portuguese zorra "dray; sly fox", from zorro "idle", from obsolete zorrar "to lag, drag" (DRAE), from Basque zuhur "clever, sly; cautious, discreet" (Trask 1997, 421), akin to Occitan mandra "fox", from adjective mandre, -a "wily". Ousted raposa, literally, "bushy (tail)"; inherited volpe still retained in Galician, volp in Old Catalan, and vulpeja (gulpeja until 14th century) "vixen" in Spanish.
- zulo "hole" (cf. Basque zulo). Recent loanword
- zurdo "left-handed" (also Galician mao xurda 'left hand', Portuguese surro, churro, churdo; cf. Basque zur "wood; stingy", zurrun "rigid, hard; pole, beam") (Coromines)
- zurrón "sack" (cf. Basque zorro)

== Names ==
=== Forenames ===
- Íñigo, from Eneko, derived from the Old Basque name Enneco, which means "my little dear", from ene (my) + ko (little).
- Iñaki, a neologism created by Sabino Arana meaning Ignatius, to be a Basque name analog to "Ignacio" in Spanish, "Ignace" in French, and "Ignazio" in Italian, and an alternative to the names Eneko and Iñigo.
- Javier, from a placename possibly derived from Basque etxe berri, meaning 'new house' or 'new home'.
- Jimeno, Ximeno, Chemene, Exemeno, from Ximen, a variant of the medieval Basque given name Semen, root seme < senbe 'son' as found in the ancient Aquitanian name Sembetten, attested form "sehi" as 'child', hypothetical ancient root *seni (cf. Koldo Mitxelena and modern form "senide" = 'brother or sister', 'relative')
- Sancho, from Santxo, derived from Latin name Sanctius, which, in turn, derived from sanctus, meaning "holy".
- Vasco, Velasco, derived from Basque "belasko", 'small raven'

== See also ==
- Linguistic history of Spanish
- List of Spanish words of Iberian origin
- List of English words of Spanish origin
