= Ro (name) =

Ro is a given name, nickname and surname. (Note: This page does not list hyphenate -ro, -Ro, Ro- or ro- names, nor people with the Royal Ro title. Select hyphenated nicknames are in the See also section.)

== People with the given name ==
- Ro Allen (fl. from 2015), Australian LGBTIQ advocate
- RoAnn Destito (Ro Ann Maggiolino Destito, born 1956), American politician
- Ro Haber (fl. from 2013), American transgender writer and director
- Ro Hindson (born 1951), Canadian rugby union player
- Rō Takenaka (1930–1991), Japanese reporter, anarchist and critic

== People with the surname ==
- Ro Chol-ok (born 1993), North Korean footballer
- Ro Do-chon (born 1936), South Korean cyclist
- Eric Ro (fl. from 2007), Korean-American producer
- Ro Hak-su (born 1990), North Korean footballer
- Ro Hyon-il (born 1969), North Korean weightlifter
- Ro Jai-bong (1936–2024), South Korean politician
- Ro Jong-suk (fl. 1979), North Korean table tennis player
- Mystique Ro (born 1994), American skeleton racer
- Ro Song-sil (born 1960), North Korean politician
- Ro Tu-chol (born 1950), North Korean politician
- YoungSang Ro (born 1954), South Korean theologian

== People with the nickname ==
- Adam Ro (Rashid Rauf Adam, fl. from 2015), Ghanaian entertainer and personality
- Angela Ro Ro (1949–2025), Brazilian singer-songwriter
- Kara Ro (Kara Rheault, born 1975), boxer
- Lady of Ro (Despina Achladiotou, 1890–1982), Greek patriot
- Maryana Ro (born 1999), Russian vlogger, singer and actress
- Yung Ro (Roland Sato Lee Page, fl. from 2009), American rapper
- Ro Atherton (Rowena Atherton, fl. from 1979), British military officer
- Ro Foege (Romaine Henry Foege, born 1938), American politician
- Ro James (Ronnie James Tucker, fl. from 2011), American singer and songwriter
- Ro Khanna (Rohit Khanna, born 1976), American politician
- Ro Mogendorff (Rosa Catherina Mogendorff, 1907-1969), Dutch artist
- Ro Ransom (Noah Gale, fl. from 2011), American musician
- RO Tambunan (Robert Odjahan Tambunan, 1935–2015), Indonesian lawyer veteran and politician

== Fictional characters with the name ==
- Kanjar Ro, DC Comics supervillain
- Ro Laren, from Star Trek: The Next Generation
- Rosalie "Ro" Rowan, from The Zeta Project

== See also ==
- J-Ro
- Z-Ro
- Roro (name)
