= Nekane =

Female given name

- Gender: Female
- Language: Basque

Origin
- Meaning: sorrow

Other names
- Related names: Dolores

Nekane is a Basque feminine given name meaning "sorrow".

== People ==
- Nekane Aramburu (born 1965), Spanish art historian
- Nekane Balluerka (born 1966), Spanish psychologist and professor
- Nekane Díez (born 1991), Spanish footballer
- Nekane Gómez (born 1999), Spanish racing cyclist

== Fictional characters ==
- Nekane Springfield, character in Negima! Magister Negi Magi
