= Rula =

Rula is a feminine given name of Arabic origin. Notable people with the name include:

== People ==
- Rula Daood (born 1985), Palestinian-Israeli activist
- Rula Ghani (born 1948), First Lady of Afghanistan
- Rula Halawani (born 1964), Palestinian photographer and educator
- Rula Hassanein (born 1994), Palestinian writer, activist, and journalist
- Rula Jebreal (born 1973), Palestinian foreign policy analyst, journalist, novelist and screenwriter
- Rula Lenska (born 1947), British actress
- Rula Maayah (born 1970), Palestinian politician
- Rula Quawas (1960–2017), Jordanian academic

== See also ==
- Rola (name)
