= LOLA =

LOLA may refer to:

- L-ornithine L-aspartate, a treatment for hepatic encephalopathy
- Law & Order: LA, an American police procedural-legal television drama series set in Los Angeles
- Lola (song), a song by The Kinks from 1970
- London Ontario Live Arts Festival, a music festival in London, Ontario, Canada
- Lunar Orbit and Landing Approach, or Project LOLA, NASA astronaut training facility
- Lunar Orbiter Laser Altimeter, an instrument on NASA's Lunar Reconnaissance Orbiter
- LOLA (film), a 2022 Irish-British science fiction film directed by Andrew Legge

== See also ==
- Lola (disambiguation)
