= Rolo (name) =

Rolo is a male Spanish given name or nickname.

== People with the name ==
- Rolo Puente (Rolando Pardo Dominguez, 1939–2011), Argentine comedian and actor
- Lord Bloody Wog Rolo (Rolo Mestman Tapier, 1945–2007), Argentine-born Australian activist
- Rolo Villar, Argentine radio host

== Fictional characters with the name ==
- Rolo Lamperouge, in Code Geass

== See also ==
- Rola (name)
- Rolo (disambiguation)
- Roro (name)
