= Lolita (disambiguation) =

Lolita is a 1955 novel by Vladimir Nabokov.

Lolita may also refer to:

== People ==
- Lolita (given name), list of people and fictional characters with this name
- This section lists people commonly referred to solely by this name.
  - Lolita (Austrian singer) (1931–2010), Austrian pop singer
  - Lolita (Italian singer) (1950–1986)
  - Lolita Milyavskaya (born 1963), stage name "Lolita"

== Arts, entertainment, and media ==
=== Films ===
- Lolita (1962 film), a film directed by Stanley Kubrick, adapted from the novel
- Lolita (1997 film), a film directed by Adrian Lyne, also adapted from the novel

=== Music ===
==== Classical music ====
- Lolita (opera), a 1992 opera by Rodion Shchedrin based on Nabokov's novel
- "Lolita: Caprice Espagnol", Opus 54 (composed 1890) by Cécile Chaminade for piano solo

==== Songs ====
- "Lolita" (Arturo Buzzi-Peccia song), an 1892 song composed by Arturo Buzzi-Peccia (1854–1943)
- "Lolita" (Belinda Peregrín song), from the 2010 album Carpe Diem
- "Lolita" (Leah LaBelle song), 2013
- "Lolita" (The Veronicas song)
- "Lolita", a song from 1960 album Barry Harris at the Jazz Workshop composed by Barry Harris
- "Lolita", a song by Christina Aguilera from the 2022 EP La Fuerza
- "Lolita", a song by Prince, from his 2006 album 3121
- "Lolita", a song from Mustard Plug's 1999 album Pray for Mojo
- "Lolita", a song from Suzanne Vega's 1996 album Nine Objects of Desire
- "Lolita", a song from Shifty Shellshock's 2004 album Happy Love Sick
- "Lolita", a song from Stereophonics' 2005 album Language. Sex. Violence. Other?
- "Lolita", a song from Elefant's 2006 album The Black Magic Show
- "Lolita", a song from the 2011 Tamil film Engeyum Kaadhal
- "Lolita", a song by Lana Del Rey, included as a bonus track on some editions of her 2012 album Born to Die
- "Lolita", a song by Cheap Trick from the 2017 album We're All Alright!
- "Lolita", a song by Paw from the 1993 album Dragline
- "Lolita (trop jeune pour aimer)", a 1987 single by French Canadian singer Céline Dion
- "Moi... Lolita", a 2000 single by French singer Alizée

=== Other arts, entertainment, and media ===
- Lolita (play), a 1981 play by Edward Albee, adapted from the novel
- Lolita, My Love, a 1971 musical by John Barry and Andrew Lerner, based on the novel
- Lolita Anime (1984–1985), a collection of adult original video animations
- Lolita, a Dutch child pornography magazine published by Joop Wilhelmus

== Other uses ==
- Lolita, Texas, a town in the U.S.
- Lolita (orca) (c. 1966 – 2023), a female orca kept at Miami Seaquarium
- Lolita (term), an English term for a sexually attractive, seductive, or precocious young girl
- Lolita fashion, a fashion subculture originating in Japan
- LOLITA, a natural language processing system developed at Durham University, England

== See also ==
- Amy Fisher, also known as the Long Island Lolita
- Florence Sally Horner
- Lalita (disambiguation)
- Lolicon, a Japanese term for an attraction to young girl characters, and related media
