= Rora =

Rora may refer to:

- Rora (name)
- Rora, a village administered by the city of Sighișoara, Mureș County, Romania
- Rora, Aberdeenshire, a rural settlement in Aberdeenshire, Scotland
- Rora, a diminutive of the Russian feminine first name Avrora (a form of Aurora)
- Rorà, a municipality in Piedmont, Italy
- Røra, a village in Nord-Trøndelag County, Norway
- RORA, RAR-related orphan receptor alpha, a gene / protein
