= Roro =

Roro may refer to:

== People ==
- RoRo (singer), Barbadian singer and songwriter

== Places ==
- Roro, Chad
- Rörö, Sweden

== Transportation ==
- Roll-on/roll-off, cargo ships designed to carry wheeled cargo
- RORO trains in India, a Rolling highway

== Other uses ==
- Roro (name), including a list of people and fictional characters with the nickname
- Rongorongo, a system of glyphs discovered on Easter Island, ISO 15924 code Roro
- Roro, a dialect of Waima language, spoken in Papua New Guinea

== See also ==
- Intermodal container, often called a shipping container
