= Roro (name) =

RoRo or Roro is a nickname.

== People with the nickname ==
- Ró-Ró (Pedro Miguel Carvalho Deus Correia, born 1990), footballer for Qatar
- RoRo (singer) (Rochelle Griffith, fl. from 2019), singer-songwriter from Barbados
- Roger Rojas (born 1990), nicknamed RoRo, Honduran footballer
- Rodrigo Roncero (born 1977), nicknamed RoRo, Argentinian rugby union player
- Ti Roro (Baillargau Raymond, died c. 1980), Haitian drummer
- Roro Perrot, nickname of Romain Perrot (born 1973), better known as Vomir, French noise music artist

== Fictional characters ==
- Rosario Salazar, also known as Ro-Ro, in American television sitcom Will & Grace

== See also ==
- Ro (name)
- Rolo (name)
- Rora (name)
- Roro (disambiguation)
