= Rora (name) =

Rora is a surname and given name. Notable people known by that name include the following:

== Surname ==
- Dino Rora (1945–1966), Italian swimmer
- Krasnodar Rora (1945–2020), Croatian football player and manager
- Shigihara Rōra, Japanese name of Laura Shigihara, American singer-songwriter, video game developer, composer, and Twitch streamer

== Nickname ==
- Rora-rora, name given to Kalola Pupuka-o-Honokawailani, Hawaiian high chiefess
- Rora Asim Khan, alternate name of Aurora Nilsson, (1894–1972), Swedish writer
- Rora, stage name of Lee Dain, South Korean singer from the girl group Babymonster

== See also ==
- Rola (name)
- Rora (disambiguation)
- Roro (name)
