= Lola Cotton =

American entertainer (1892–1975)

- Born: November 15, 1892; Waterloo, Iowa, United States
- Died: July 9, 1975 (aged 82); San Diego, California, United States

Lola Carmelita Cotton (born November 15, 1892, in Waterloo, Iowa; died July 9, 1975, San Diego) was, as a child, a vaudeville mentalist and hypnotist, whose performance career flourished from about 1899 to 1915. Her shows were particularly popular in Los Angeles, California and New York City.

== Girl phenomenon ==
As a six-year-old she performed feats of memory at the Orpheum Theatre in Los Angeles. A particular venue often headlined her ability to solve a psychological puzzle.

At Keith's, 14th Street (Manhattan) between Broadway (Manhattan) and 4th Avenue, owned by Benjamin Franklin Keith, she performed a mind reading act in April 1903. Her routine included mental telegraphy with a touch of mystery added. Initially she was introduced by a man who proceeded through the audience. He pointed to objects which members of the audience suggested while Cotton was blindfolded. A sample of the dialogue which transpired between Cotton and her interlocutor is What is this? A gold nugget. Right. And this? A railroad pass. The number. The number is 10,961. It is dated April 28. She named all types of things from buttons to the color of a woman's eyes. Then the man requested the audience to call out numbers. He transcribed them on a board. They read 38171562, 49078399, 672872217. Without hesitating Cotton said the totals of each column with her eyes remaining blindfolded. At the Orpheum in October 1899 she made the combination moves of the Knight (chess) on a chessboard while blindfolded. She could begin from any number on the board. Her moves were carried out so rapidly that one's eyes could barely follow her.

The Eight Vassar Girls and singer Charles Vance entertained at the Alhambra Theater, 2110 Adam Clayton Powell Jr. Blvd., New York City, in April 1907. Cotton was among the attractions in this vaudeville show. Billed as a hypnotist, she was in a September 1907 production staged at Keith & Proctor's 125th Street Theatre, in Harlem, New York. She appeared with singer Emma Carus at Hammerstein's Victoria Theatre of Varieties, 1481 Broadway, in March 1908. A few weeks before she was again at the Alhambra Theatre with Gertrude Hoffman. The latter gave an imitation of Eva Tanguay singing I Don't Care. The song had sparked a rivalry between the two women.

== Family ==
Lola was the daughter of John L. Cotton, a San Diego barber and actor, and Della (Delia) Lorette Cotton.

On May 20, 1914, Lola married Roby Charles Jonesin San Diego, though only for a month. On May 23, 1914 – three days after their wedding – Lola deserted Roby on the grounds that, "her husband's love was too violent in its nature to meet with her approval." A month after their wedding, Lola filed for divorce on the grounds that Roby, a special policeman with the City of San Diego, had threatened to kill her. In 1915, Roby married Mabel B. Slaff, then divorced her in 1918, then, subsequently married Bertha Kamer (1888–1988).

On August 21, 1915, Lola married Earl Frank Brown. Together, they had a son, Frank Leo Brown (1918–1976).
