= Rollo (disambiguation) =

Rollo was the founder and first ruler of the Viking principality in what soon became known as Normandy.

Rollo may also refer to:

== Places ==
- Rollo Department, Burkina Faso
  - Rollo, Burkina Faso, a town in Rollo Department
- Rollo, Illinois, United States, an unincorporated community
- A common nickname for the city of Rovaniemi, Finland

== Other uses ==
- Rollo (record producer), an English music producer
- Rollo (name), including lists of people and characters with the given name or surname
- Clan Rollo, a Scottish clan
- Lord Rollo, a title in the Peerage of Scotland
- "Rollo," a part of Frank Zappa's "Don't Eat the Yellow Snow" suite
- An Italian roll cake

== See also ==
- Rolo, a chocolate-covered caramel candy
- Rolla (disambiguation)
