= Lola Costa =

English painter, writer and poet

Carola "Lola" Costa (England, 1903 – Florence, 2004) was an English painter, writer and poet. She was born in England to a Ligurian father and an Anglo-French mother, Marie Antoinette Lesieur, with whom she shared artistic interests. Costa’s works often feature still lifes, everyday scenes, or portraits of family members, neighbors, and rural laborers.

In the early 1920s, Costa left London to live with her mother in France, where her artistic career took off. She married Federigo Angeli, who was also a painter. The pair purchased Villa Il Palmerino in Florence in 1935. Costa worked and resided there during the height of her career, from 1936 to 1948, and would live at Villa Il Palmerino for 70 years.

Costa's famous works include Portovenere, Portrait of Ornella, and Il Palmerino. Today, her works can be found in private collections and the Pitti Palace (Florence) in the Modern Art Gallery collection. Recent exhibitions of her work include Private Mythologies in 2014 and Return Home: Lola Costa at Il Palmerino in 2024.

== Early life ==
Although Lola Costa was born in England in 1903, her parents were not native Britons. Her father was a Ligurian businessman, descended from the counts 'Costa di Carmagnola', and her French mother grew up in Normandy. When her parents separated in the early 1920s, Costa accompanied her mother to Paris, where they lived in relative poverty, heavily reliant on her mother's aristocratic friends, to whom Lola often sold paintings. Costa spent much of her time painting the streets and writing in her diary while working as a shop assistant, until she was taken to Egypt by a French actress, who made her her companion and lady-in-waiting. Costa arrived in Florence at the end of the 1920s after teaching English in Milan with the Berlitz school.

== Personal life and relationships ==
Costa transferred to the Berlitz Florentine branch and became a private tutor. She began tutoring the Tuscan artist Federigo Angeli, soon becoming his muse, and they married in 1932. The couple moved to the watch tower turned Villa il Palmerino, which once belonged to another English adoptive Florentine, the writer Vernon Lee. They raised four children together: Matelda, Federigo's daughter with his first wife who died in childbirth (1929), Giuliano (1933), Fiorenza (1935), and Beatrice (1938).

Costa took the Tuscan landscape surrounding the Villa, which was to be her home until her death, as one of her favourite subjects and frequent settings of her paintings of family and friends. Soon after moving into the Villa, she and her husband swiftly became immersed in the Florentine artistic milieu. Their friends included Elisabeth Chaplin, another English expatriate artist living in Florence, the Spanish-born avant-garde painters Antonio and Xavier Bueno, Futurist artist Primo Conti, painter Baccio Maria Bacci, and politician Piero Bargellini.

Costa remained in Italy for the rest of her long life.

== Career ==
Costa's favoured subject matter rested in the everyday, such as still life, landscapes and portraits. Despite a strong sense of spirituality, being a devout Catholic, she rarely attempted religious paintings. Her son Giuliano summarised her approach to painting as a "spiritual practice in itself."

She exhibited her work in 1942 at the "Mostra d’Arte Toscana" in Palazzo Strozzi, promoted by the Regional Fascist Syndicate of the Fine Arts, where she was honored; and in 1943 at the Exhibition of Contemporary Artists in Bergamo. She participated in "La donna nell’arte" at the Galleria 14 in Florence in 1971/72/73/74. However, she rarely made big sales, as she often preferred to gift her paintings. "She was interested in maintaining relationships. Sharing, not success, was her ultimate goal," said her son Giuliano.

Throughout her life, she experimented with different mediums and techniques; using oil, tempera, and gouache while continuing to draw and use water colour in the sketchbook that she always brought with her. Similarly, her style of painting varied, showing visibly the influence of different contemporary European movements; from the vivid colours of fauvism to the incisive strokes of German expressionism. The warm light of the Tuscan countryside also influenced her chromatic palette.

Painting, however, was not her sole creative outlet. She also wrote prose and poetry, such as I libri sotto il tappeto. Firenze: T. A. F, published in 1993, and a poetry book in 1995, Maverick Carri Armati e Altro. Palermo: Il libro italiano.

== Notable works ==
- Garden in Paris, 1927, Oil on canvas
- Portovenere, 1932, Oil on canvas
- Mercato a Firenze (il Porcellino), 1932, Oil on panel
- Threshing Wheat, 1933, Tempera on canvas
- Tulips and Playing Cards, 1937, Oil on canvas
- Primroses in a Blue Vase and Ball of Yarn, 1938, Oil on cardboard
- View of Il Palmerino Field, 1940, Oil on cardboard
- Fruit, 1940, Oil on canvas
- Matelda, 1940, Oil on canvas
- Dead Leaves, 1941, Oil on panel
- The Lemon Keeper, 1942, Oil on canvas
- Portrait of Ornella, 1948, Oil on canvas
- Alive and Quivering (Studies of Fish), 1949, Tempera and oil on canvas
- Les Tamaris at High Tide, 1954, Oil on canvas
- View of Il Palmerino Field, 1960, Oil on hardboard
- Still Life with Bird and Peaches, 1972, Oil on cardboard
- Basket of Pomegranates, 1972, Oil on board
- Chiari’s Farm House, 1972, Oil on cardboard
- Vase with Quinces, 1972, Oil on cardboard
- Lavender and Vases, 1973, Oil on board
- Artichoke Flowers and Eggs, 1974, Oil on cardboard
- Quinces and Rolling Pin, 1974, Oil on board
- Vincenzo, 1974, Oil on cardboard
- Veronique, 1974, Oil on cardboard
- Laura while Convalescent, 1977, Oil on cardboard
- Pomegranates and Orange Pot, 1978, Oil on cardboard
- Little Statue with Orchids, 1979, Tempera on cardboard
- The Criminal, 1980, Oil on hardboard
- Maiano, Before the Storm, 1988, Oil on canvas
- Viola, 1988, Oil on cardboard, sketch-like portrait
