= Rola Hoteit =

Pilot

- Born: 1974 (age 51–52); Doueir, Lebanon
- Occupations: Airline Captain, Middle East Airlines
- Spouse: Fadi Khalil

Rola Hoteit (Arabic: رولا حطيط) is the first Lebanese female airline captain to ever work for Middle East Airlines, flying the Airbus 320 and Airbus 330. Hoteit also serves as Regional Vice President of IFALPA for the Middle East Region.

== Early life ==
Hoteit was born to a Shiite family in 1974 in a small town in Lebanon, Doueir. She has had an aptitude for mathematics since she was a child, and before considering pilot training, she had envisioned a career in mathematics for herself. During her childhood, as a result of the ongoing war in Lebanon, Hoteit faced major difficulties from regular switching between schools, as well as, being obliged to resort to home schooling at times. Nevertheless, Hoteit successfully managed to complete her studies and join the American University of Beirut (AUB).

== Career ==
As Hoteit describes, she was pursuing her BS in mathematics at the American University of Beirut when a turn of events resulted in her deciding to become a pilot. During the summer semester of her Sophomore year, in 1993, a male classmate saw a recruitment advertisement for the Middle East Airlines regarding a search for potential pilots, and both males and females were allowed to apply. Her classmate proceeded to mock the advertisement as he had the impression that women could hardly drive cars and that it would be absurd for an airline pilot to be a woman. Hoteit details that, even though she had never considered becoming an airline captain, this specifically angered her to the point of challenging her classmate to sit for the entrance exam and see who could get higher grades.

Hoteit was the only female among the nine people who passed the professional examination, which included written, medical, psychometric, fixed simulator, IQ, Mechanical comprehension, and eye-hand coordination exam. She was later accepted to start as a cadet pilot with MEA. Once she finished her sophomore year, she left to Scotland, Perth, where she started her training and later received her Airline Transport Pilot License (ATPL). During her years of training, she met her, then, future husband, a fellow Lebanese and an airline captain as well, who is now head of the Lebanese Pilots Association.

Ten years later, Hoteit returned to finish her BS in mathematics at the American University of Beirut. She completed her studies while flying at the same time and graduated in 2003 when her elder son was only 2 years old. In 2013, Hoteit rejoined AUB to pursue a Masters Degree in Philosophy.

Hoteit served as a first officer, or co-pilot, for 15 years, until she got her promotion, thus becoming the first female captain in the MEA and Lebanon. She also further continued her studies, obtaining an Aviation Psychology degree from the University of Graz, Austria.

Currently, Hoteit is the Regional Vice President (Middle East) with IFALPA.

=== Obstacles and difficulties ===
Hoteit's very first challenge was to get her father to accept her career-path choice. This was the result of the ingrained mentality that middle eastern families go by, bringing up a liberal girl and her father's belief that flying a plane would be a waste of her intelligence, instead of pursuing a PhD in Mathematics. Nevertheless, with a little help from her mother, who is a mathematics teacher herself, Hoteit was able to convince her father that her choice to become a pilot was the right one for her.

Talking about her experience, she recalled, "I had to undergo extremely tough tests...much tougher than those a male pilot would have to undergo." She reasoned this by clarifying that “being the first woman pilot," her training was like a "pilot project, a model for future female candidates.” And as per Hoteit, since women are "more emotional and sensitive by nature", the trainers had to test her performance under pressure in the most extreme possible scenarios. Even when she successfully finished her training and came back to Beirut to get her national license, her colleagues showed "a lot of negativity" and shock for her gender.

Hoteit led her first single trip on March 16, 2011, heading to the Jordanian capital Amman. Onboard among the passengers was Former Prime Minister Tammam Salam. She stated that during that flight, some passengers were irritated by the fact that the pilot was a female.

Hoteit, being a mother of two, described that the biggest challenge for women, especially women pilots, is balancing between career and family life. Being a pilot, night schedules are often unavoidable, which according to Hoteit, was the main obstacle between her and her family. Furthermore, she shared that her work often kept her from caring for her children, and that once her son was hospitalized while she and her husband, also an airline pilot, were away on duty.

Hoteit also said that after the 2006 Lebanese War, both, she and her husband, decided never to be on command at the same time.

== Recognition ==
Upon becoming the first female ever to break into a male-dominant field, the BBC recognized Hoteit among the Top 100 Women in the World in 2016. She was additionally selected as one of the top 100 influential Lebanese figures in the world, as featured in the book, "The 100: Meet 100 Influential Lebanese Figures Around the Globe". She has also been given the honorary fellowship title from the Royal Aeronautical Society in the United Kingdom.
