= Lalitha Ravish =

Indian politician

Lalitha Raveesh
- Occupation: Politician

Lalitha Ravish (alternatively spelt Lalitha Raveesh) is an Indian politician and the former mayor of Tumkur, Karnataka, India. She is a Janata Dal (Secular) politician.

== Career ==
Ravish is a Janata Dal (Secular) politician. In January 2015, in the Tumakuru City Municipal Corporation election she was elected as the mayor of the city. Roopa from the Bharatiya Janata Party was elected as the deputy mayor.
