= Rola Sleiman =

Rola Adel Sleiman, B.Th.C.E. (born 1975) is a Lebanese-Syrian female pastor, the first woman to be appointed to the Christian ministry in the Arab world. She was ordained on 26 February 2017.

Sleiman was born in Tripoli, Lebanon, to a Syrian father and Lebanese mother. She was brought up in the Evangelist Presbyterian Church of Tripoli, located in Rahibat Street, and studied theology under the sponsorship of the National Evangelical Synod of Syria and Lebanon, a church that has only 3000 members altogether. She began to officiate at services in Tripoli when the regular pastor was away during 2006, and replaced him permanently in 2009. The Synod eventually voted by a majority of 23 to 1 to ordain her as his replacement so that the church could host baptisms and other services that could only be presided over by an ordained minister. She stated that she had needed "a lot of silence, patience and effort" to succeed in her vocation.

In May 2017 a controversy arose when the UK government refused Reverend Sleiman's request for a visa in order to allow her to visit the General Assembly of the Church of Scotland, at which she had been invited to speak. The Home Office's decision was overturned a few days later, following representations from the Church of Scotland, but Sleiman was still not allowed to board a flight from Beirut to the UK.
