= Rolla Township =

Rolla Township may refer to:

- Rolla Township, Morton County, Kansas, in Morton County, Kansas
- Rolla Township, Phelps County, Missouri
