= Dolors Vives Rodon =

Pioneering Spanish female aviator

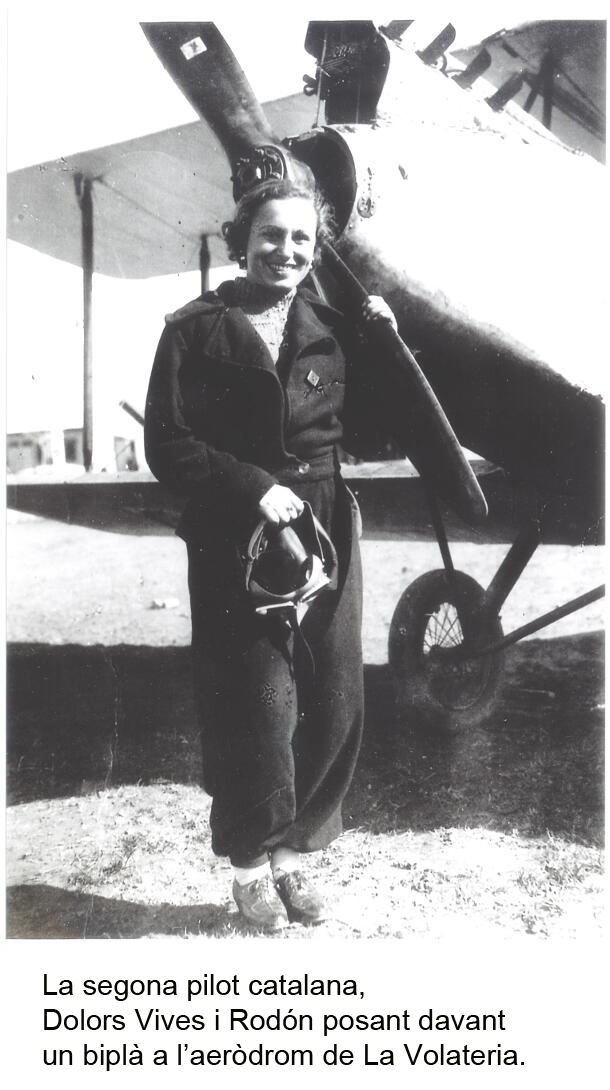
Dolors Vives Rodon

Dolors Vives i Rodon, also Lolita Vives, (15 August 1909 – 12 June 2007) was a pioneering Spanish aviator. A founding member of the Club Aereo de Barcelona, in May 1935 she became the second Catalan woman to pilot an aircraft, receiving Licence No. 217 from the aeronautical authorities. During the Spanish Civil War, she flew for the Republican armed forces.

== Biography ==
Born on 15 August 1909 in Valls, she moved with her parents to Barcelona when she was 12. Raised in a forward-looking family with a father who was a pharmacist, she attended the Institut de Cultura i Biblioteca Popular de la Dona (Cultural Institute of the Women's Popular Library) where the girls were taught to act independently.

Encouraged by her father, in 1932 she became a founding member of the Aero Club Popular de Barcelona. She soon learnt to fly, receiving her official licence in 1935. In 1936, she became president of the Aero Club. The same year, she was granted a licence to fly non-motorized aircraft.

In 1936, after the outbreak of the Spanish Civil War, she joined the Republican Army where she trained young volunteers as pilots, forming a basis for the Republican Air Force. She also undertook a number of reconnaissance missions along the Mediterranean coast. While many Republicans left Spain at the end of the war, Dolors Vives remained in Barcelona where she became a piano teacher and took care of a family with 12 children.

Dolors Vives Rodon died in Barcelona on 12 June 2007, aged 97.
