= Rolla (ship) =

Rolla may refer to a number of sailing ships;

- Rolla (1800 ship), was built in 1800 at South Shields, England. She made one voyage transporting convicts to New South Wales. She then made a voyage for the British East India Company from China back to Britain. She leaves Lloyd's Register in 1858.
- Rolla (1805 ship) was a 152 or 165-ton (bm) 16 to 18-gun brig built in France in 1801. She twice received letters of marque in 1805. She made one trip as a slave ship during which the French Navy captured her. The British Royal Navy recaptured her in February 1806 at Cape Town and took her into service. She returned to England in December 1807 and was laid up until sold in 1810. She then became a merchantman until she was lost or broken up in 1825.
- Rolla (1803), a 118-ton (bm) brig built in Yarmouth
- Rolla (1804), a 225-ton (bm) snow built in North America that received letters of marque in 1807 and 1810.
- Rolla (1809 schooner), of 117 or 132 tons (bm), an American privateer schooner, launched in 1809 at Baltimore, that captured or recaptured some 10 vessels before HMS Loire captured her on 10 December 1813. She then became the Nova Scotia privateer Rolla. She sank in January 1815 off Cape Cod with the loss of her entire crew of 42 men, and nine prisoners from prizes she had captured.
- Rolla (1813), a 250-ton (bm) schooner built in A.P.
- Rolla (1816 ship), a brig built in New Providence. She was abandoned c.1864.
- Rolla (1819), a 130-ton (bm) brig built in Sunderland
- Rolla (1840), a 309-ton (bm) snow built in North Shields

== See also ==
- HMS Rolla
