= Dolors Prat =

Spanish trade unionist (1905–2001)

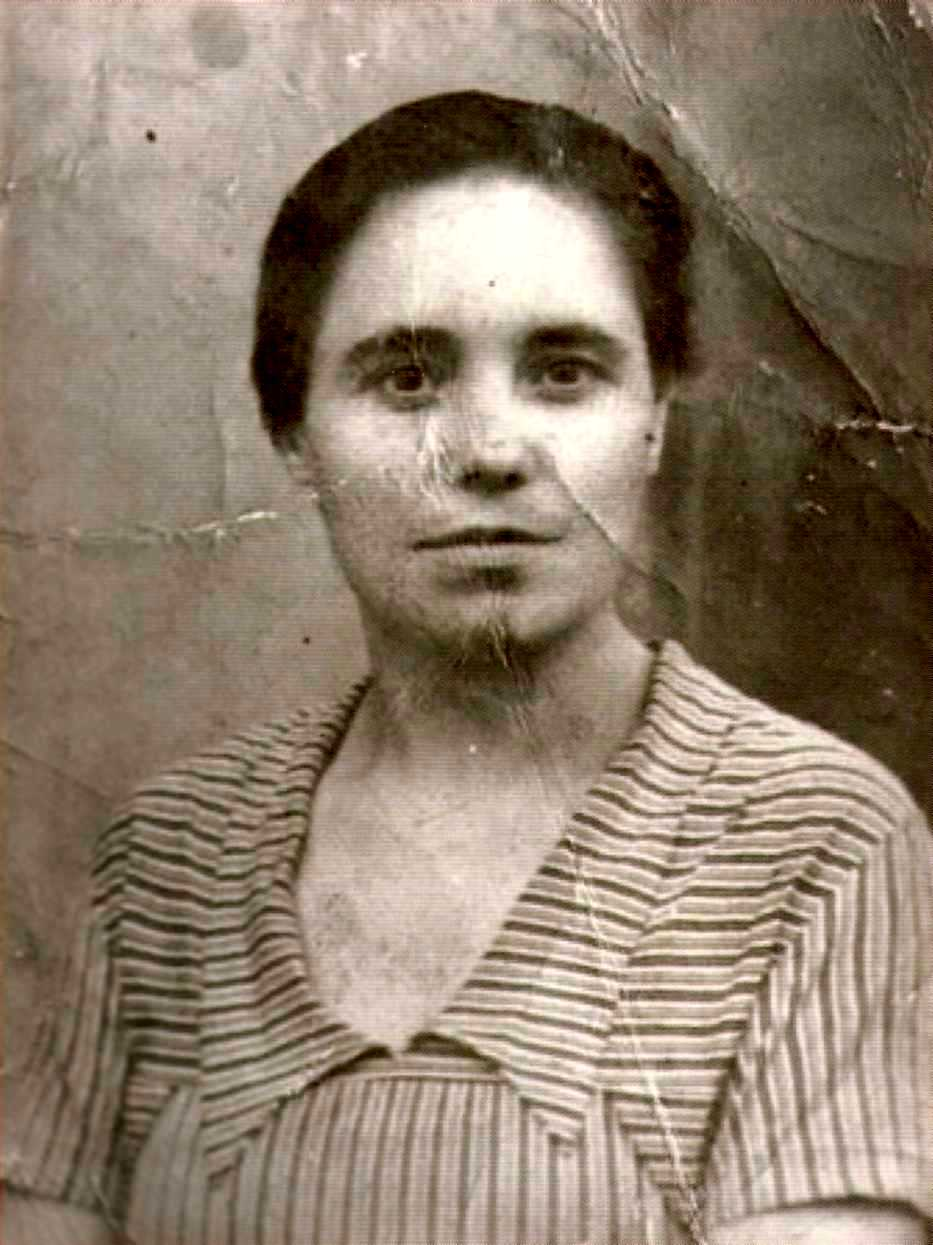
- Prat, c. 1940
- Born: Dolors Prat Coll; 8 March 1905; Ripoll, Catalonia, Spain
- Died: 12 September 2001 (aged 96); Tolosa, Occitania, France
- Other name: Little Montseny
- Organisation: National Confederation of Labour

Dolors Prat Coll (Note: Also known by the Spanish: Dolores Prat.) (8 March 1905 – 12 September 2001) was a Spanish trade unionist, feminist and migrants' rights activist. Born in Ripoll, at a young age, she was inspired by a textile workers' strike to find work in a textile factory and joined the National Confederation of Labour (CNT). She oversaw the collectivisation of her workplace during the Spanish Revolution of 1936 and became the general secretary of her union during the Spanish Civil War. When the Republic was defeated, she was forced to flee to France, where she remained active in the CNT and agitated for the rights of undocumented immigrants.

== Biography ==
Dolors Prat Coll was born into a poor family on 8 March 1905, in the Catalan city of Ripoll. After her mother Maria died when Dolors was only seven years old, she was sent to live in a convent, which she recalled as a difficult experience. She later studied at the local school while also caring for her family, including her deaf-mute sister Clara.

In 1919, she observed a strike action by Ripoll's textile workers for the eight-hour workday. The strike radicalised her, due to the hunger she saw the striking workers going through and the anger she developed against strikebreakers. At the age of 15, her father pushed her to get a job; she did not want to become a teacher, due to her dislike of the nuns who educated her, and refused his offer of running a fruit and vegetable stall, as she believed she would just give the food away. Inspired by the strike, she instead went to work at a textile factory and joined the National Confederation of Labour (CNT), an anarchist trade union federation. She served on her factory committee, which collectivised the factory and established workers' self-management of production during the Spanish Revolution of 1936.

During the Spanish Civil War, Prat served as general secretary of the Ripoll textile workers' union. As foreign orders decreased during the war and they were forced to cut hours, she oversaw the adoption of a three-day workweek, in order to avoid making any workers unemployed, and maintained existing salaries. Prat also gained a local reputation as a committed feminist and an advocate for gender equality. She was often compared to Federica Montseny and was nicknamed "the little Montseny" (Catalan: la petita Montseny). She fled to France, ahead of the Nationalists' Catalonia Offensive in January 1939, and was detained in an internment camp in Magnac-Laval. The French government ordered that all women and children unaccompanied by male guardians be deported to Spain in February 1940, but Prat herself clandestinely returned to France on 15 May.

As an undocumented migrant, Prat was only able to find low-paid work at a quarry in Prades, but she later regularised her immigration status and moved to Toulouse. She remained active in the CNT, becoming the secretary of its local federation and participating in the strikes of May 68, and worked in the International Antifascist Solidarity organisation. She also had two children, Progreso and Floreal, together with José Marín. She remained in Toulouse even after the Spanish transition to democracy, remaining active as an activist for the rights of undocumented migrants. She was also interviewed as a primary source on the civil war for a number of documentary films, and by Martha Ackelsberg for her book on the Mujeres Libres. On 12 September 2001, she died in Toulouse at the age of 97. Since 1996, Catalan activists have held annual walks from Ripoll to Prats de Molló, in commemoration of Prat's escape from Spain.

== Bibliography ==
- Ackelsberg, Martha A. (2005) [1991]. Free Women of Spain: Anarchism and the Struggle for the Emancipation of Women. Oakland, California: AK Press. ISBN 1-902593-96-0. LCCN 2003113040. OCLC 63382446.
- Espílez Murciano, Felipe (7 November 2021). "Dolores Prat Coll "La pequeña Montseny"". Encima de la Niebla (in Spanish). ISSN 2695-5245.
