= Lalith =

Lalith may refer to

- Lalith Dissanayake, Sri Lankan politician
- Lalith Athulathmudali, Sri Lankan politician
- Babu M.R. Lalith, Indian chess player
- Lalith Wijerathna, Sri Lankan politician
- Lalith Kaluperuma, Sri Lankan cricketer
- Lalith Kotelawala, Sri Lankan businessman
- Lalith J. Rao, Indian classical singer
- Lalith Weeratunga, Sri Lankan politician
- Lalith Gamage, Sri Lankan professor
- Lalith Jayasinghe, Sri Lankan Army officer
- Lalith Jayasundara, Sri Lankan cricketer umpire
