= Dolor (sculpture) =

Sculpture in Mexico City, Mexico

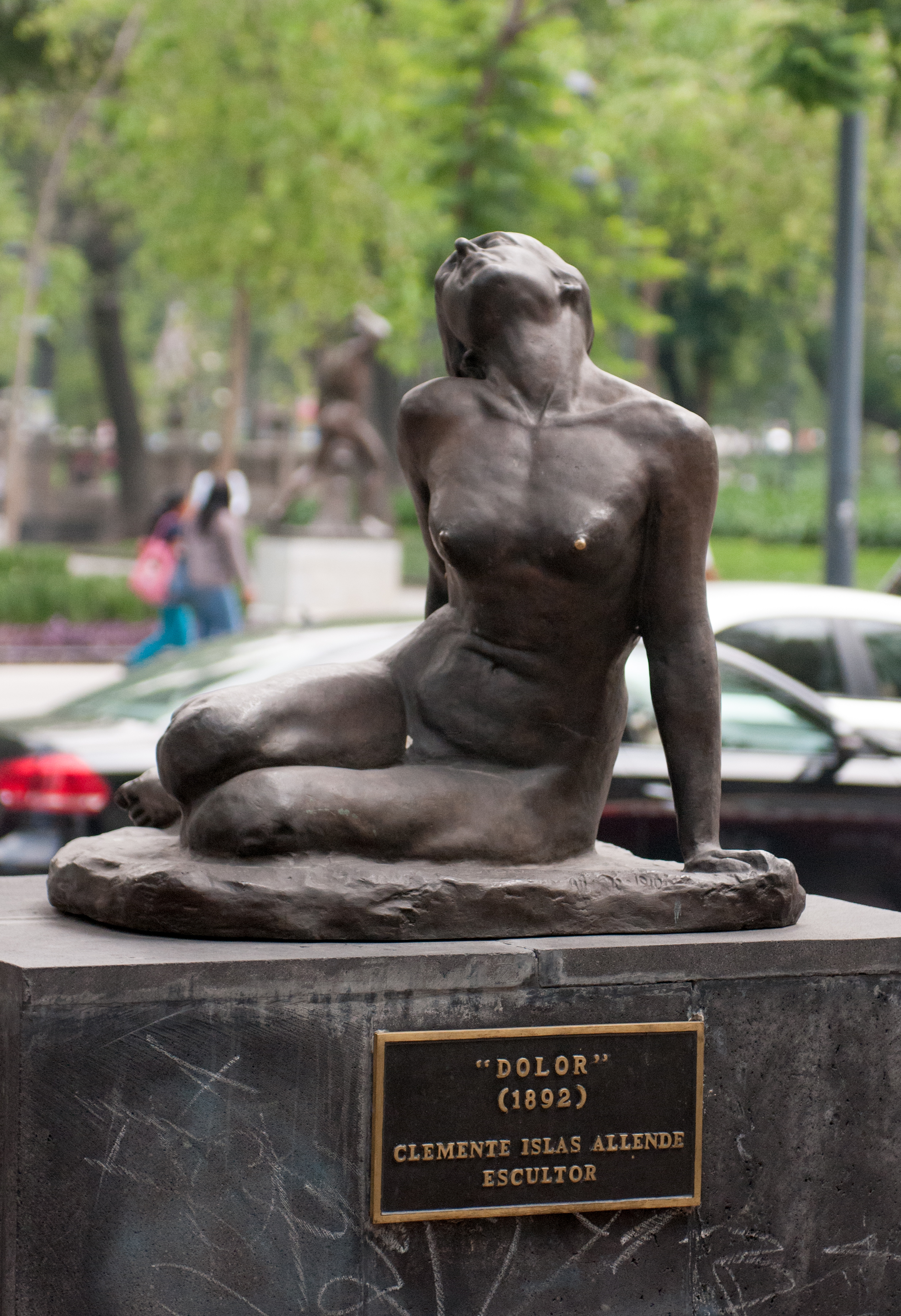
- The statue near Alameda Central, 2015
- Artist: Clemente Islas Allende
- Location: Mexico City, Mexico
- 19°26′5.6″N 99°8′43.1″W

Dolor (English: "Pain") is a sculpture of a nude woman by Clemente Islas Allende. There is a statue in the collection of Museo Nacional de Arte, and a statue installed across from Alameda Central, in Mexico City.
