= Lola Solar =

Austrian politician (1904–1989)

Member of the Parliament
- In office 11 August 1949 – 31 March 1970

Personal details
- Born: 13 May 1904 Brunn am Gebirge, Lower Austria
- Died: 20 May 1989 (aged 85) Mödling, Austria
- Party: Austrian People's Party
- Profession: Teacher

Lola Solar (1904–1989) was an Austrian teacher and politician. She was a member of the Austrian People's Party which she represented in the Austrian Parliament. She was the first president of the European Union of Women and served in the post between 1955 and 1959.

== Early life and education ==
Solar was born in Brunn am Gebirge, Lower Austria, on 13 May 1904. Her father, Josef Solar, was a lawyer. She graduated from the Teacher Training College in 1926.

== Career ==
Following her graduation Solar worked as a teacher and school administrator. She was a member of the Austrian People's Party and acted as its district leader from 1945. She became a member of the parliament on 11 August 1949. Her term as a deputy ended on 31 March 1970. She was elected as president of the European Union of Women in 1955 which was established in Salzburg in 1953. Solar's tenure ended in 1959 when Elsa Conci was elected to the post. She involved in the description of the tasks and objectives of the Union in the mid-1960s in cooperation with Elisabetta Conci, Italian member of the Union.

== Death and legacy ==
Solar died in Mödling on 20 May 1989. In her memory a street was named after her in her hometown Brunn am Gebirge.
