= Maria Dolores Bargues Castelló =

Spanish parasitologist

Maria Dolores Bargues Castelló (València, 1958) is a professor and researcher at the University of Valencia, specializing in Parasitology and Tropical Medicine.

She started studying Pharmacy, but over time specialized in Microbiology and Parasitology. She has traveled all over the world to learn first-hand about the problems of diseases caused by infectious agents, especially fasciolosis, and thus be able to diagnose and treat them.

She is the first woman president of the Spanish Society of Tropical Medicine and International Health.
