= Mescal =

Mescal and Mescall may refer to:

== Places ==
- Mescal, Arizona, census designated place in Arizona
- Mescal Arroyo, creek in Pima County, Arizona
- Mescal Mountains, series of connected mountain ridges in southern Gila County, Arizona
- Mescal Range, mountain range in California

== People ==
- Nell Mescal (born 2003), Irish singer-songwriter
- Paul Mescal (born 1996), Irish actor
- Don Mescall, Irish singer-songwriter
- Greg Mescall (born 1981), sports commentator
- John J. Mescall (1899–1962), American cinematographer

== Other ==
- Mescal agave, alternative name of the plant, Agave parryi
- Mescal bean, alternative name of the plant, Dermatophyllum
- Mescal, a Coahuiltecan tribe
- Mescal, a character in the 1924 film The Heritage of the Desert played by Bebe Daniels
- Mezcal, alcoholic drink made from the Mescal agave plant
- Mescal: The 'Divine' Plant and Its Psychological Effects, a 1928 book by Heinrich Klüver

== See also ==
- Mezcal, Mexican distilled alcoholic beverage
- Mescaline, naturally occurring psychedelic protoalkaloid
- Mescalito, small, spineless cactus also known as peyote
