= Lolita Pille =

French author

Lolita Pille (born August 27, 1982) is a French author, best known for her early novels: Hell (2002, France), translated as Paris 75016: Hell's Diary (2003, UK), and Bubble Gum. After two further novels in 2008 and 2019, Pille wrote an autobiographical account of her youth in Une Adolescente in 2022.

== Bibliography ==
- Hell, Grasset, 2002, ISBN 2-246-63251-X
- Paris 75016: Hell's diary (translated by Robert Davies), Studio 9 books, 2003, ISBN 9781552072035.
- Bubble Gum, Grasset, 2004, ISBN 2-246-64411-9
- Crépuscule Ville, Grasset, 2008
- Elena et les joueuses, Le Livre de poche, 2019, ISBN 9782253934561
- Une Adolescente, Éditions stock, 2022, ISBN 978-2-2340-8924-2

== Movie Adaptations ==
- 2006 : Hell, directed by Bruno Chiche.
