= Dolores (given name) =

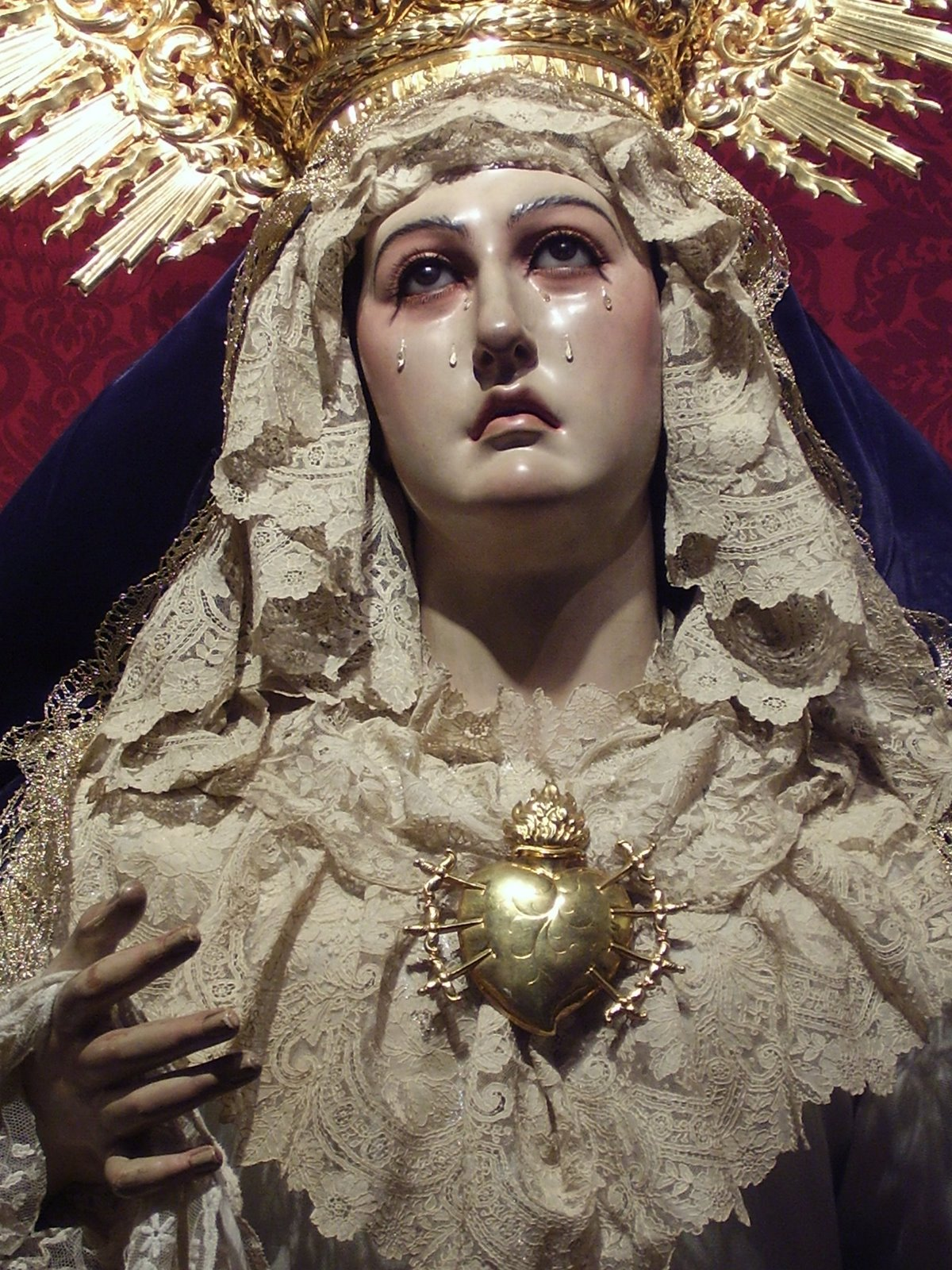
- Nuestra Señora de los Dolores (Our Lady of the Sorrows). El Viso del Alcor (Seville, Spain).
- Pronunciation: /dəˈlɔːrɪs/, Spanish: [doˈloɾes]
- Gender: Female

Origin
- Origin: Spanish
- Meaning: Sorrowful, literally "sorrows", "pain"
- Region of origin: Spain, Latin America, Ireland

Other names
- Related names: Lola, Lolita, Loli

Dolores is a feminine given name of Spanish origin.

== History ==
The Spanish word dolores is the plural form of dolor, meaning either sorrow or pain, which derives from the Latin dolor, which has the same meaning and which may ultimately stem from Proto-Indo-European *delh-, "to chop".

The usage of Dolores as a given name has its origins in the strong influence of the Roman Catholic Church in Spanish-speaking countries. The name is a reference to Nuestra Señora de los Dolores (or La Virgen María de los Dolores), one of the many titles of Mary, Mother of Jesus, typically translated to Our Lady of Sorrows in English.

In given names, Dolores is frequently preceded by the name Maria (Maria Dolores), the Spanish form of Mary, or one may even bear the entirety of the title (María de los Dolores) as part of their given name. Notable examples of such include the Spanish noblewoman Juana María de los Dolores de León Smith and the Mexican actress Dolores del Río, who was born María de los Dolores Asúnsolo López-Negrete. Less commonly, one might use de los Dolores as part of their name, but not paired with María. Lola, Loli, Lolis, and Lolita are all popular nicknames for individuals named Dolores, based on the name's second syllable.

== Variants ==
- Dolors (Catalan)
- Delora, Delores, Deloris, Dolores, Dollie (diminutive), Dolly (diminutive), Lola (diminutive), Lolita (diminutive), Lolicia (diminutive, rare), Lori (diminutive) (English)
- Dolorosa (Esperanto)
- Dolorès (French)
- Dores (Galician)
- Addolorata (Italian)
- Dolorosa (Latin)
- Dores (Portuguese)
- Nekane (Basque)
- Dolores, Lola (diminutive), Loli (diminutive), Lolis (diminutive), Lolita (diminutive) (Spanish)
- Долорес, Лолита, Лола (Dolores, Lolita, Lola), Долли (diminutive), Лора (diminutive, rare), Лëля (diminutive) (Russian)
- Lola, Lolka, Lolli (Czech)

== Notable bearers ==
=== Deloris ===
- Norma Deloris Egstrom (1920–2002), American singer, better known as Peggy Lee
- Mablean Deloris Ephriam (born 1949), American prosecuting attorney and adjudicator for Divorce Court from 1999 until 2006

=== Delores ===
- Marva Delores Collins (1936–2015), American educator
- Delores Churchill (born 1929), Canadian Haida traditional weaver
- Delores M. Etter (born 1947), American electroengineer
- Delores Ann Richburg Greene (1936–2022), American educator, college dean
- Delores G. Kelley (born 1936), American politician
- Delores McQuinn (born 1954), American politician and minister
- Delores Taylor (1932–2018), American actress, film producer, and writer
- C. Delores Tucker (1927–2005), American civil rights activist
- Delores Ziegler (born 1951), American mezzo-soprano opera singer

=== Dolores ===
- Dolores (Ziegfeld girl) (1893–1975), English model
- Dolores (artists' model) (1894–1934), English model
- Dolores Alexander (1931–2008), American activist
- Dolores Cannon (1931–2014), American author, hypnotherapist, and publisher
- Dolores Correa Zapata (1853–1924), Mexican teacher, writer, poet, and advocate for women's rights
- Dolores Costello (1903–1979), American actress
- Dolores Crow (1931–2018), American legislator
- Dolores Duran (née Adiléia Silva da Rocha; 1930–1959), Brazilian singer-songwriter
- Dolores Ehlers (1896–1983), Mexican filmmaker and businessperson
- Dolores Fonzi (born 1978), Argentine actress
- Dolores Lewis Garcia (born 1938), Native American potter
- Dolores Guinness (1936–2012), German socialite
- Dolores Hart O.S.B. (born 1938), American actress and Roman Catholic nun
- Dolores Huerta (1930–2026), American labor activist
- Dolores Ibárruri (1895–1989), Spanish politician
- Dolores Jiménez Hernández (born 1955), Mexican diplomat
- Dolores Keane (1953–2026), Irish folk singer
- Dolores Lambaša (1981–2013), Croatian actress
- Dolores Moran (1926–1982), American actress and model
- Dolores O'Riordan (1971–2018), Irish singer-songwriter and member of The Cranberries
- Dolores Palumbo (1912–1984), Italian actress
- Dolores Pedrares (born 1973), retired Spanish hammer thrower
- Dolores Della Penna (1954–1972), murder victim in the United States
- Dolores del Río (née María de los Dolores Asúnsolo López-Negrete; 1904–1983), Mexican actress
- Juana María de los Dolores de León Smith (1798–1872), Spanish noblewoman and descendant of Juan Ponce de León
- Madame Dolores born Antonia Dolores Trebelli (1864–1951), soprano (also Mademoiselle Dolores)

=== Doloris ===
- Doloris Bridges (1916–1969), American politician

=== Dolours ===
- Dolours Price (1950–2013), member of the Provisional Irish Republican Army

=== Fictional characters ===
- Delores Landingham, fictional character from The West Wing
- Dolores Claiborne, the title character in Stephen King’s novel
- Dolores Umbridge, fictional character from the Harry Potter series
- Dolores Haze, fictional character from the novel Lolita
- Dolores Abernathy, fictional character from Westworld

=== Other uses ===
- Deloris, Australian rock band
- Norma Deloris Egstrom from Jamestown, North Dakota, album by Peggy Lee
