= Lalita (1949 film) =

- Directed by: Kalyan Gupta
- Produced by: Great Eastern Movieton
- Starring: Lokanatha Mishra; Uma Banerjee; Sumati Devi; Pankaj Nanda
- Music by: Kali Charan Pattanayak
- Distributed by: Great Eastern Movieton
- Release date: 1949
- Country: India
- Language: Odia

Lalita is a 1949 Indian folklore Oriya film directed by Kalyan Gupta.

== Plot ==
King Indradyumna completes a temple at Puri, but cannot find the living deity, Nila Madhaba (Lord Jagannath). He sends messengers in all directions to bring him the news about Lord Nila Madhaba. One Brahmin messenger, Bidyapati, comes across a Savara village in the dense forest and stays there as guest to the Savara king Biswabasu. Bidayapati hears that Biswabasu secretly keeps the lord Nila Madhaba in a remote cave and worships him. Bidyapati pretends to fall in love with Biswabasu's daughter Lalita and finally marries her. Lalita persuades her father to show her husband the Lord. Biswabasu agrees and takes Bidyapati to the cave. Bidyapati plans to take the deity to Puri, but the deity vanishes.

== Cast ==
- Lokanatha Mishra – Bidyapati
- Uma Banerjee – Lalita
- Sumati Devi – Maya
- Pankaj Nanda – Bishwabasu
- Dampdar Das – Indradyumna

== Production ==
It was the second film in the Odia language, released thirteen years from the first, Sita Bibaha. Uma Banerjee, who plays the heroine in Lalita, is married to Makhanlal Banerjee, the hero of Sita Bibaha.
