= Lolita (given name) =

- Gender: Female

Origin
- Origin: Spanish
- Meaning: "Sorrows" or "pains"
- Region of origin: Spain

Other names
- Related names: Lola, Dolores

Lolita (/ləˈliːtə/, /lɒlˈiːtə/, or US: /loʊˈliːtə/) is a female given name of Spanish origin. It is the diminutive form of Lola, a hypocorism of Dolores, which means "sorrows" or "pains" in Spanish and is the reference to Nuestra Señora de los Dolores (Our Lady of Sorrows), one of Spanish titles of Mary, mother of Jesus.

== Popularity ==
According to the United States Social Security Administration, the popularity of the name Lolita peaked in the United States in 1963, when it was the 467th most popular female name. The SSA has not ranked Lolita in the top 1000 most popular female names given since 1973, and in the 1990 United States census, Lolita was ranked the 969th most frequent female name out of 4,275 unique names.

Despite its association with Vladimir Nabokov's scandalous 1955 novel Lolita, the name remains popular in some other countries, e.g. Latvia where its name day is 30 May.

== Notable people ==
- Lolita Ananasova (born 1992), Ukrainian swimmer
- Lolita Ayala (born 1951), Mexican journalist
- Lolita Carbon (born 1957), Filipino singer, member of Asin (band).
- Lolita Chakrabarti (born 1969), British actress
- Lolita Chammah (born 1983), French actress
- Lolita Čigāne (born 1973), Latvian politician
- Lolita Davidovich (born 1961), Canadian actress
- Lolita de la Colina (born 1948), Mexican singer
- Lolita Einzinger (1931–2010), Austrian singer
- Lolita Files (born 1963), American writer
- Lolita Flores (born 1958), Spanish actress and singer
- Lolita Javier (born 1975), Filipina politician
- Lolita Kreivaitienė (born 1960), Lithuanian designer
- Lolita Lebrón (1919–2010), Puerto Rican political activist
- Lolita Lempicka (born 1954), French fashion designer
- Lolita Milyavskaya (born 1963), Russian singer and actress
- Lolita Morena (born 1960), Swiss actress
- Lolita Pille (born 1982), French writer
- Lolita Ritmanis (born 1962), Latvian-American composer
- Lolita Rodrigues (born 1929), Brazilian actress
- Lolita Rodriguez (1935–2016), Filipino actress
- Lolita Sevilla (1935–2013), Spanish actress
- Lolita Tizol (1890–1933), Puerto Rican educator
- Lolita Torres (1930–2002), Argentine actress
- Lolita Coffin Van Rensselaer (1875–1947), American clubwoman
- Lolita Yermak (born 1996), Ukrainian ice dancer

=== Fictional characters ===
- Lolita, 12-year-old Dolores Haze in Vladimir Nabokov's 1955 novel Lolita
- Lolita Pulido, the central female character of Johnston McCulley's 1919 novel The Curse of Capistrano

== See also ==
- Loleatta Holloway
- Lilita
