= RIPD =

RIPD may refer to:

== R.I.P.D. ==
Related works named for the fictional afterlife law enforcement agency "Rest in Peace Department" include:

- R.I.P.D., a 2013 comedy film
- R.I.P.D., the original 1999 comic book, created by Peter M. Lenkov and published by Dark Horse Comics
- R.I.P.D. The Game, a 2013 third-person shooter video game
- R.I.P.D. 2: Rise of the Damned, a 2022 direct-to-video prequel

== Other ==
- Roosevelt Island Police Department (RIPD), predecessor of the RIPSD, Roosevelt Island Public Safety Department
- RAAF Inland Petrol Depot; the Australian air force inland aircraft fuel depots
- Routing Information Protocol Daemon (ripd), software
- Ibero-American Data Protection Network (RIPD; Spanish: Red Iberoamericana de Protección de Datos)

== See also ==
- Ripped (disambiguation)
- Rip (disambiguation)
- RPD (disambiguation)
