= RPD =

RPD may refer to:

== People ==
- Robert Prentiss Daniel, American psychologist
- Rahul Peter Das, German professor
- Royal Page Davidson, American scholar
- Richard Paul Davies, English priest
- Richard Peter Davis, American musician
- Robert P. Davis, American author and filmmaker
- Robert Peel Dawson, English-Irish politician
- Rajan P. Dev, Indian actor
- R. Paul Dhillon, Indian-Canadian journalist
- Robert P. Dick, American judge
- Richi Puspita Dili, Indonesian badminton player
- Robert Percy Douglas, British Army general
- Rose Philippine Duchesne, French nun
- Robert P. Dunlap, American politician
- Rosa Pam Durban, American novelist
- R. Palme Dutt, English journalist
- Royden Patrick Dyson, American politician

== Organizations ==
- Raccoon Police Department, fictional organization from the Resident Evil video games
- Raleigh Police Department in North Carolina
- Rashtriya Parivartan Dal, Indian political party
- Reno Police Department in Nevada
- Revenue Policy Division, Bangladesh
- Richmond Police Department in California
- Richmond Police Department in Virginia
- Riverside Police Department in California
- Rochester Police Department in New York
- Rochester Products Division, New York branch of car manufacturer General Motors
- Rockville City Police Department in Maryland
- RPD Energy, American energy company
- RPD International, British design and manufacturing firm

== Other ==
- FAA LID for Rice Lake Regional Airport
- Rack phase difference, an oilfield term
- Reactive plasma deposition, a thin film deposition method
- Recognition-primed decision, a decision-making model
- Regional policy dialogue, an initiative of the Inter-American Development Bank
- Relative percent difference, a statistical measure of deviation between two measurements
- Removable partial denture, a dental prosthesis
- RNase PH domain, an exoribonuclease domain in certain enzymes
- Robot programming by demonstration, a technique to teach new skills to robots
- Robust parameter design, a technique for design of processes and experiments
- RPD machine gun, a Soviet light machine gun
- Revenue per day (RPD), a financial measurement commonly used in the car rental industry

== See also ==
- RIPD
