= Ripper =

Ripper or The Ripper may refer to:

== People ==
- Ripper (surname)
- Jack the Ripper, a pseudonym for an unidentified serial killer (or killers) active in London in the latter half of 1888
- Paul Burchill, ring name "The Ripper", a professional wrestler based on Jack the Ripper
- Kirk Hammett, nicknamed "The Ripper", the lead guitarist in the heavy metal band Metallica
- Ripper Jayanandan (born 1968), Indian serial killer
- Tim "Ripper" Owens, a heavy metal singer
- Psicosis II, a Mexican Luchador enmascarado who was renamed Psyco Ripper and then Ripper
- Terry "The Ripper" Rivera, a professional wrestler from All-Star Wrestling
- Danny Rolling, serial killer known as the "Gainesville Ripper"
- Peter Sutcliffe, known as the "Yorkshire Ripperl, a serial killer active in Yorkshire from 1975–1980
- Brandon Vedas, nicknamed "Ripper", a man who died of a drug overdose on IRC

== Arts and entertainment ==
=== Fictional characters ===
- Ripper (G.I. Joe), in the G.I. Joe universe
- "Ripper", the villain in the Arnold Schwarzenegger film Last Action Hero
- Rupert Giles, a major character from the TV series Buffy the Vampire Slayer also known as "Ripper"
- General Jack D. Ripper, in the movie Dr. Strangelove, played by Sterling Hayden
- Rippers, horizontally flying bug-like creatures belonging to the Metroid series
- Rippers, a race of mutant kangaroo–human hybrids in the graphic novel and film Tank Girl
- Stefan Salvatore, from The Vampire Diaries also known as "Ripper"

=== Film and television ===
- Ripper (film), a 2001 Canadian-British slasher film
- Ripper (Buffy the Vampire Slayer spinoff), a proposed TV series featuring the character Rupert Giles
- The Ripper (TV series), a 2020 British docuseries about Peter Sutcliffe, the Yorkshire Ripper
- "Ripper" (The Outer Limits), a television episode

=== Games ===
- Ripper (video game), a computer game released in 1996
- The Ripper (video game), a video game cancelled in 2009

=== Literature ===
- Ripper (El juego de Ripper), a novel by Isabel Allende
- Ripper, the fourth novel in Michael Slade's long-running Special X series

=== Music ===
- Ripper, a Houston heavy metal band, and recording artists for Black Widow Records
- "The Ripper", a song by Judas Priest, from the album Sad Wings of Destiny

== Devices ==
- Ripper, a slater's tool with a blade and a hook, used for removing broken slate
- Ripper, a moveable hard steel hook on the back of a bulldozer used to break up hard soil or pavement
- CD ripper, software that reads compact discs and extracts audio data and stores it in an audio format computer file
- DVD ripper, software that copies the contents of a DVD to a hard disk
- Seam ripper, a sewing implement

== Sports ==
- Grand Rapids (baseball team), known as the Rippers in 1894 and 1896
- London Rippers, a former professional baseball team based in London, Ontario, Canada

== Other uses ==
- Ripper (duck), a musk duck known for imitating human speech
- Ripper (food), a variety of hot dog served in New Jersey
- Ripper (racquet), a racquetball racquet from Wilson Sporting Goods
- Ripper, a colloquialism for flatulence
- Gibson Ripper, a model of electric bass guitar
- Operation Ripper, a United Nations Korean War operation
- Repeated Incremental Pruning to Produce Error Reduction (RIPPER), a propositional machine learning rule learner

== See also ==
- Rip (disambiguation)
- RIP (disambiguation)
