= Rest in Pieces =

Rest in Pieces may refer to:

- Rest in Pieces (film), a 1987 Spanish horror film
- R.I.P., Rest in Pieces, a 1997 documentary film
- "Rest in Pieces" (American Horror Story), an episode of the television series American Horror Story
- Mystic Midway: Rest in Pieces, a 1992 video game
- "Rest in Pieces (April 15, 1912)", a song from the 1989 album Blessing in Disguise by Metal Church
- "Rest in Pieces", a song from the 1990 soundtrack album Predator 2 by Alan Silvestri
- "Rest in Piece", a song from the 1996 album Welcome to the Infant Freebase by The Soundtrack of Our Lives
- "Rest in Pieces", a song from the 2002 album Back into Your System by Saliva
- Rest in Piece 1994–2012, a 2014 album by the rock band The Soundtrack of Our Lives
- Rest in Pieces, a 2020 album by the rock band Heaven Below
- "Rest in Pieces", an episode of the television series CSI: Miami

== See also ==
- Rest in Peace (disambiguation)
