= Rip =

To rip is the act of tearing an object.

Rip may also refer to:

== Places ==
- Kingdom of Rip in Senegal, ruled by Maba Diakhou Bâ (1809–1867)
- Říp, a mountain in the Czech Republic
- The Rip, entrance to Port Phillip from Bass Strait in Victoria, Australia
- Ríp, a farm and church site in Iceland
- Rip Point, South Shetland Islands, Antarctica
- Rip Bridge, New South Wales, Australia
- 7711 Říp, an asteroid

== People ==
- Rip (given name)
- Rip (nickname)
- Rip (surname)
- Rip Hawk, ring name of American professional wrestler Harvey Evers (1930–2012)
- Rip Morgan, a ring name of New Zealand professional wrestler Michael Morgan (born 1957)
- Rip Oliver, a ring name of American professional wrestler Larry Oliver (1952–2020)
- Rip Rogers, a ring name of American professional wrestler Mark Sciarra (born 1954)
- Rip Rogers, along with Eddie Graham, a ring name of American professional wrestler Edward F. Gossett (1930–1985)
- Rip Sawyer, a ring name of American professional wrestler Sidney Garrison (born 1965)
- Rip Torn, a nickname for American actor Elmore Rual "Rip" Torn Jr. (1930–2019)

== Arts, entertainment, and media ==
=== Fictional characters ===
- Rip Clutchgoneski, in the film Cars 2
- Rip Hunter, a DC Comics character
- Mason "Rip" Irving, a title character of the Rip and Red children's book series
- The epnymous character of Rip Haywire, an American comic strip
- The eponymous character of Rip Kirby, an American detective comic strip from 1946 to 1999
- Rip Riley, in the animated television series Archer
- Rip Thomas, in the 1989 movie No Holds Barred, played by Hulk Hogan
- Rip Wheeler, in the television series Yellowstone
- Rip Van Winkle, title character of the eponymous story by Washington Irving
- Rip Blazkowicz, father of B. J. Blazkowicz

=== Music ===
- Rip, in music, a type of glissando
- "The Rip" (song), a 2008 single by Portishead
- "Rip (Rest in Peace)", a 2023 song by Maltese singers Aidan and Ira Losco
- The Rip, a former band of New Zealand musician Alastair Galbraith

=== Other uses in arts, entertainment, and media ===
- The Rip (film), a 2026 American action thriller starring Matt Damon and Ben Affleck
- RiP!: A Remix Manifesto, a 2008 documentary about remixing and intellectual property
- Ripping, the process of copying audio or video from removable media to a hard disk
  - High-quality rips, edits of video game music presented as genuine rips by or in the style of SiIvaGunner

== Ships ==
- Rip, originally HMQS Paluma, an Australian gunboat, scrapped in the 1950s
- Rip, the name from 1947–1984 of HMAS Whyalla (J153), a decommissioned Australian corvette

== Animals ==
- Rip (dog), a Second World War search-and-rescue dog awarded the Dickin Medal for bravery
- Ol' Rip the Horned Toad, a Texas horned toad which supposedly survived a 31-year hibernation in a time capsule in a cornerstone

== Computing ==
- .rip, a generic top level domain
- Routing Information Protocol (RIP), a routing protocol

== See also ==
- Rip current or rip tide, a strong surface flow of water returning seaward from near the shore
- Rip cut, severing or dividing a piece of wood parallel to the grain
- Rips (disambiguation)
- Ripped (disambiguation)
- Ripper (disambiguation)
- Ryp (disambiguation)
