= Rips =

Rips may refer to:

== Places ==
- Rips, Sarandë, a location in Albania on the border with Greece
- De Rips, a village in the Netherlands

== People ==
- Eliyahu Rips (1948–2024), Israeli mathematician
- Lance Rips (born 1948), American psychologist
- Nicolaia Rips (born 1998), American author

== Other uses ==
- Rips (album), a 2014 album by American indie rock band Ex Hex
- RIPS (Re-Inforce Programming Security), a software static code analysis tool
  - RIPS Technologies, the company that publishes RIPS
- Radio-isotope power system, or radioisotope thermoelectric generator

== See also ==
- Rip (disambiguation)
