= Normal law =

Normal law may refer to:

- Normal distribution and the Gaussian law(s) relating to the bell curve
- The primary flight control mode for fly-by-wire Airbus aircraft
- Ordinary law, law lower than the Constitution
