= RIP (disambiguation) =

RIP (abbreviating rest in peace, or Latin: requiescat in pace) is a common element of Christian epitaphs.

RIP may also refer to:

== Arts, entertainment, and media ==
=== Music ===
- RIP (band), punk band from Basque Country (Spain)
- R.I.P. or R.I.P. Productions, an alias of the UK garage duo Double 99

==== Albums ====
- R.I.P. (Coroner album), 1987
- R.I.P. (The Zombies album), originally scheduled for 1969, later released in 2000
- R.I.P. (Murder City Devils album), 2003
- R.I.P. (Rocket from the Crypt album), 2008
- R.I.P. (Actress album), 2012
- R.I.P. (Recording In Progress), 2014 album by Lil Rob

==== Songs ====
- "R.I.P." (Rita Ora song), 2012
- "R.I.P." (Young Jeezy song), 2012
- "R.I.P." (Sofía Reyes song), 2019
- "R.I.P." (Motionless in White song), 2026
- "Rip (Rest in Peace)", 2023 song by Aidan and Ira Losco
- "R.I.P.", by 3OH!3 from Streets of Gold, 2010
- "R.I.P.", by September from Dancing Shoes, 2007
- "R.I.P", by Childish Gambino from Royalty, 2012
- "R.I.P.", by Brooke Candy featuring Ashnikko from the album Sexorcism, 2019
- "RIP", by Olivia O'Brien, 2017
- "R.I.P.", by Playboi Carti from the album Die Lit, 2018
- "R.I.P. (Duskcore Remix)", by Bring Me the Horizon on the album Post Human: Nex Gen
- "R.I.P. (Rock in Peace)", by AC/DC from Backtracks, 2009
- "R.I.P. (Rest in Pain)", by Sepultura from Schizophrenia, 1987
- "Rip", a song by Big Black from Lungs

=== Other uses in arts, entertainment, and media ===
- "R.I.P." (story) (1998), by Poppy Z. Brite
- RiP!: A Remix Manifesto (2008), open-source documentary film
- R.I.P.: Requiem in Phonybrian, 1999 manga
- R.I.P., Rest in Pieces, 1997 film
- RIP: Roast in Peace, Italian TV show

== Biology ==
- Repeat-induced point mutation, a process by which DNA in some fungi accumulates mutations
- Ribosome-inactivating protein, a type of protein that controls ribosomes
- RNA immunoprecipitation, with an antibody

== Computing ==
- Raster image processor
- Relative Instruction-Pointer, a processor register for holding an instruction pointer in the x86-64 architecture
- Remote Imaging Protocol, for using graphics instead of text on a BBS
- Routing Information Protocol, in computer networks

== Other uses ==
- Ranger Indoctrination Program, U.S. Army
- Reduced ignition propensity cigarette
- Regulation of Investigatory Powers Act 2000, a UK act of Parliament
- Restricted isometry property, in mathematics
- R.I.P. cartridge (Round, Irritant, Personnel), or tear-gas cartridge, a specialist shotgun ammunition
- RIP Medical Debt, American charity
- Ripponlea railway station, Melbourne

== See also ==
- Rip (disambiguation)
- Rest in Peace (disambiguation)
