= Jackup rig =

Type of mobile platform

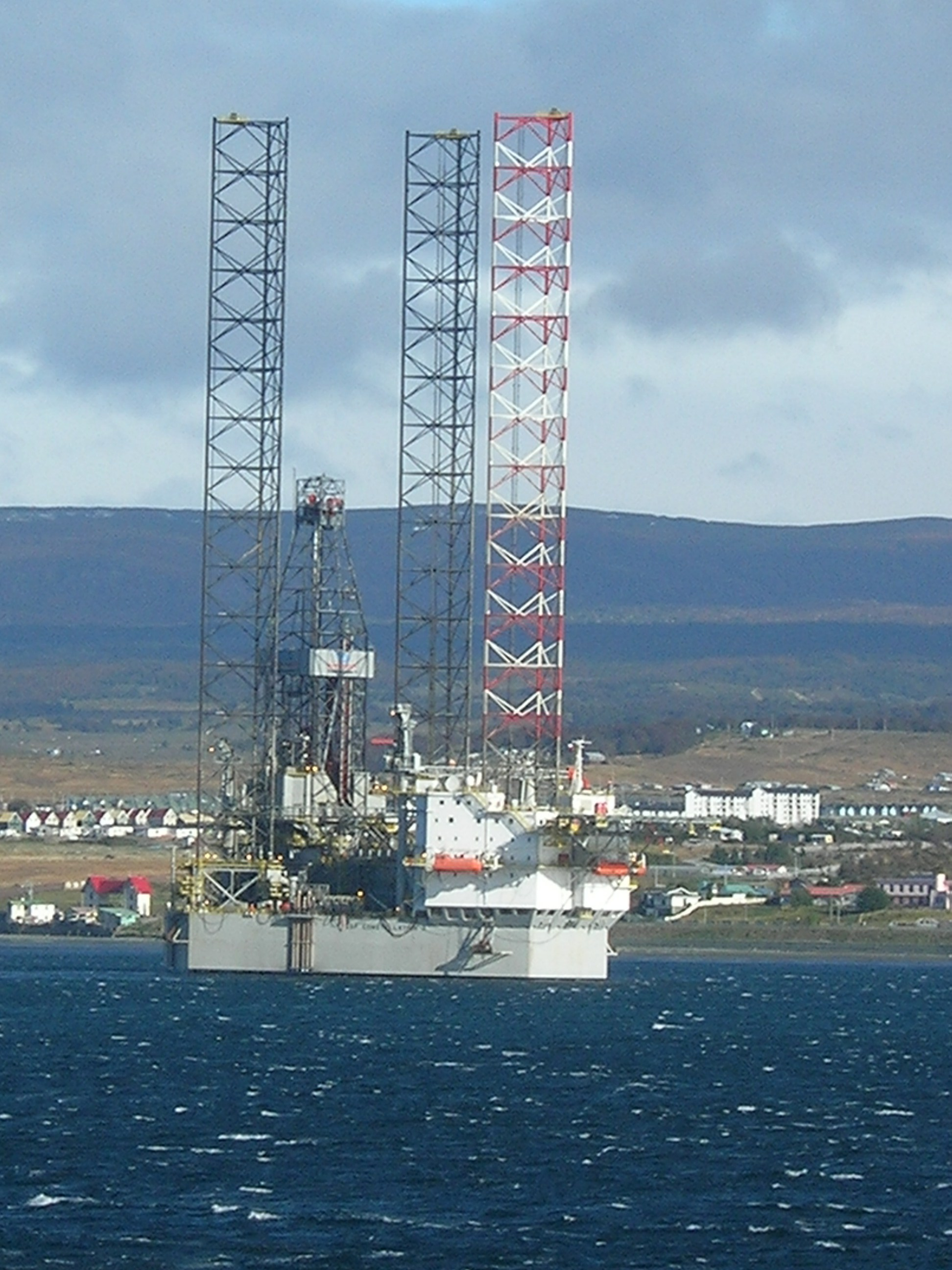
A jackup oil rig

A jackup rig or a self-elevating unit is a type of mobile platform that consists of a buoyant hull fitted with a number of movable legs, capable of raising its hull over the surface of the sea. The buoyant hull enables transportation of the unit and all attached machinery to a desired location. Once on location the hull is raised to the required elevation above the sea surface supported by the sea bed. The legs of such units may be designed to penetrate the sea bed, may be fitted with enlarged sections or footings, or may be attached to a bottom mat. Generally jackup rigs are not self-propelled and rely on tugs or heavy lift ships for transportation.

Jackup platforms are almost exclusively used as exploratory oil and gas drilling platforms and as offshore and wind farm service platforms. Jackup rigs can either be triangular in shape with three legs or square in shape with four legs. Jackup platforms have been the most popular and numerous of various mobile types in existence. The total number of jackup drilling rigs in operation numbered about 540 at the end of 2013. The tallest jackup rig built to date is the Noble Lloyd Noble, completed in 2016 with legs 214 metres (702 ft) tall. Due to their stability and versatility, jackup rigs remain a preferred choice for offshore operations in water depths typically up to 150 meters

== Name ==
Jackup rigs are so named because they are self-elevating with three, four, six and even eight movable legs that can be extended (“jacked”) above or below the hull. Jackups are towed or moved under self propulsion to the site with the hull lowered to the water level, and the legs extended above the hull. The hull is actually a water-tight barge that floats on the water's surface. When the rig reaches the work site, the crew jacks the legs downward through the water and into the sea floor (or onto the sea floor with mat supported jackups). This anchors the rig and holds the hull well above the waves.

== History ==
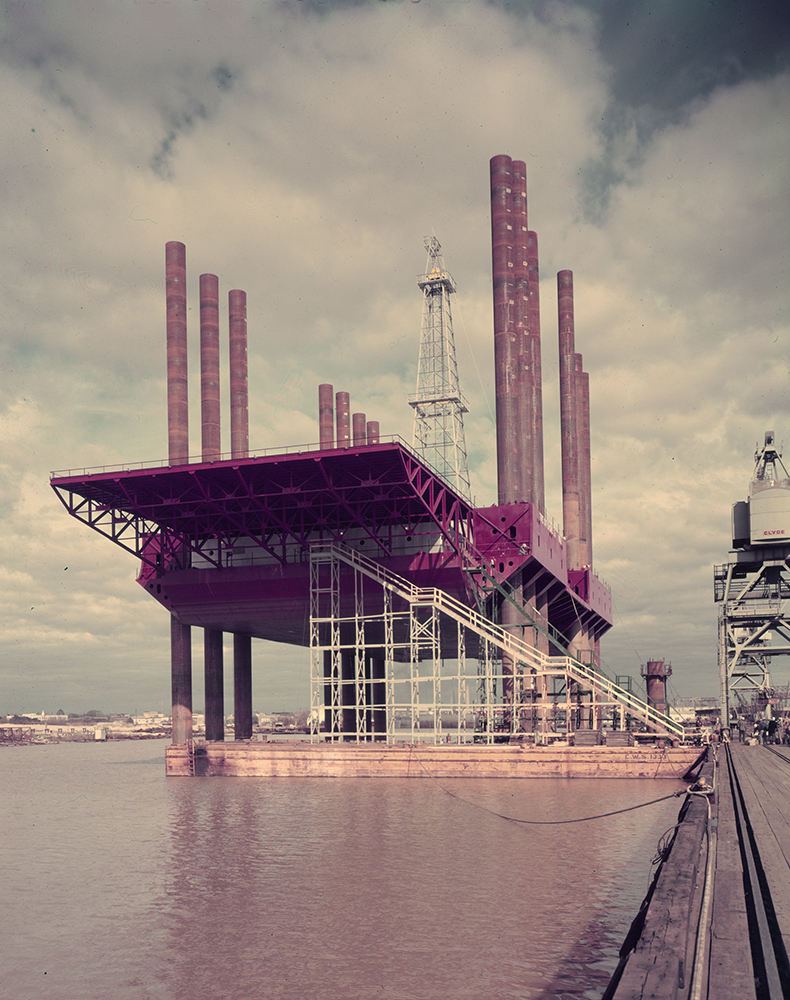
A DeLong platform at Consolidated Western, Orange, Texas, in 1955

An early design was the DeLong platform, designed by Leon B. DeLong. In 1949 he started his own company, DeLong Engineering & Construction Company. In 1950 he constructed the DeLong Rig No. 1 for Magnolia Petroleum, consisting of a barge with six legs. In 1953 DeLong entered into a joint venture with McDermott, which built the DeLong-McDermott No.1 in 1954 for Humble Oil. This was the first mobile offshore drilling platform. This barge had ten legs which had spud cans to prevent them from digging into the seabed too deep. When DeLong-McDermott was taken over by the Southern Natural Gas Company, which formed The Offshore Company, the platform was called Offshore No. 51.

In 1954, Zapata Offshore, owned by George H. W. Bush, ordered the Scorpion. It was designed by R. G. LeTourneau and featured three electro-mechanically operated lattice type legs. Built on the shores of the Mississippi River by the LeTourneau Company, it was launched in December 1955. The Scorpion was put into operation in May 1956 off Port Aransas, Texas. The second, also designed by LeTourneau, was called Vinegaroon.

== Process of operation ==
A jackup rig is a barge fitted with long support legs that can be raised or lowered. The jackup is maneuvered (self-propelled or by towing) into location with its legs up and the hull floating on the water. Upon arrival at the work location, the legs are jacked down onto the seafloor. Then "preloading" takes place, where the weight of the barge and additional ballast water are used to drive the legs securely into the sea bottom so they will not penetrate further while operations are carried out. After preloading, the jacking system is used to raise the entire barge above the water to a predetermined height or "air gap", so that wave, tidal and current loading acts only on the relatively slender legs and not on the barge hull.

Modern jacking systems use a rack and pinion gear arrangement where the pinion gears are driven by hydraulic or electric motors and the rack is affixed to the legs.

Jackup rigs can only be placed in relatively shallow waters, generally less than 120 metres (390 ft) of water. However, a specialized class of jackup rigs known as premium or ultra-premium jackups are known to have operational capability in water depths ranging from 150 to 190 meters (490 to 620 ft).

== Types ==
=== Mobile offshore Drilling Units (MODU) ===
This type of rig is commonly used in connection with oil and/or natural gas drilling. There are more jackup rigs in the worldwide offshore rig fleet than other type of mobile offshore drilling rig. Other types of offshore rigs include semi-submersibles (which float on pontoon-like structures) and drillships, which are ship-shaped vessels with rigs mounted in their center. These rigs drill through holes in the drillship hulls, known as moon pools.

=== Turbine Installation Vessel (TIV) ===
This type of rig is commonly used in connection with offshore wind turbine installation.

=== Barges ===
Jackup rigs can also refer to specialized barges that are similar to an oil and gas platform but are used as a base for servicing other structures such as offshore wind turbines, long bridges, and drilling platforms.

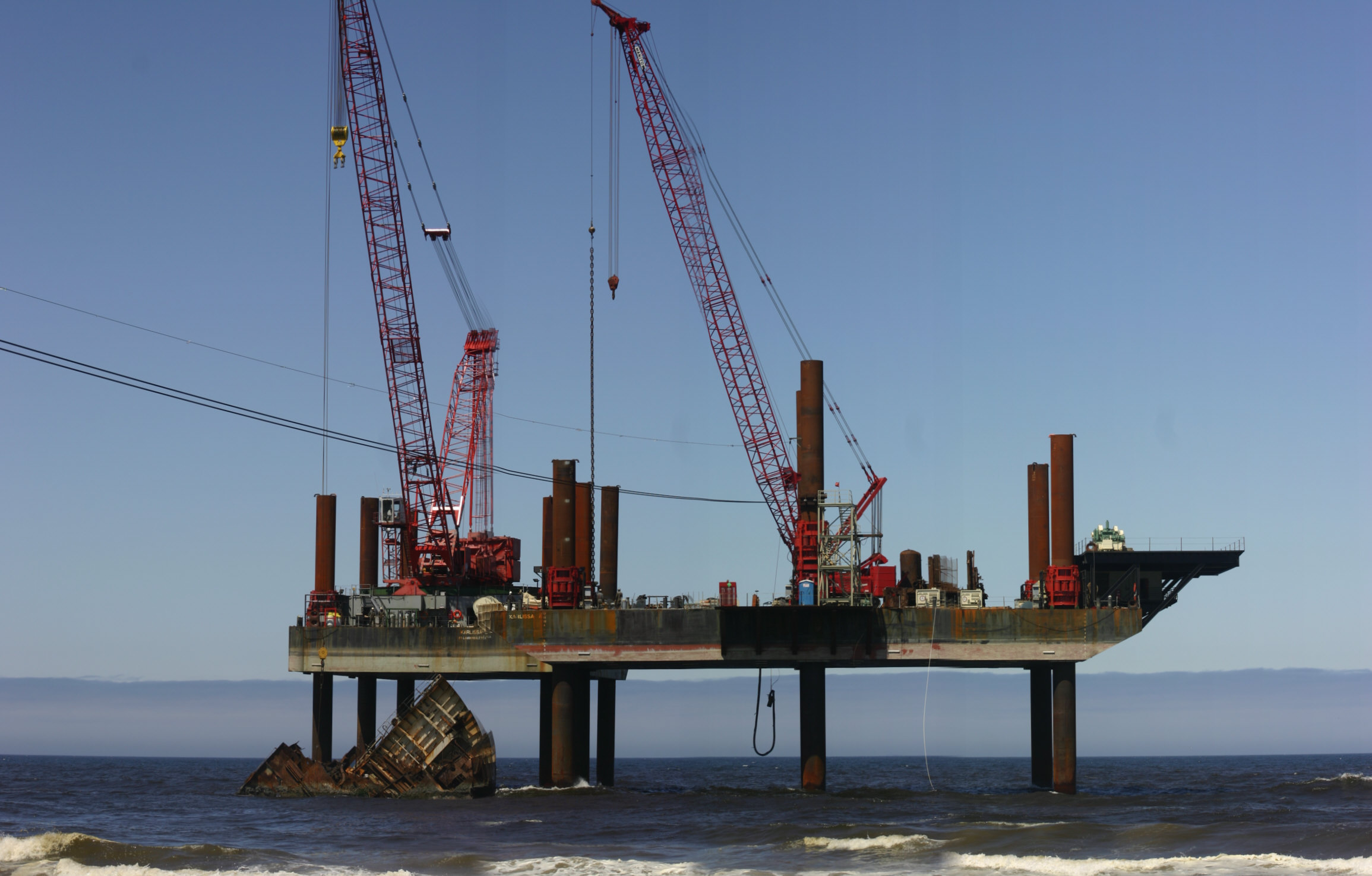
Jackup barges being used to dismantle a ship that was wrecked at sea.

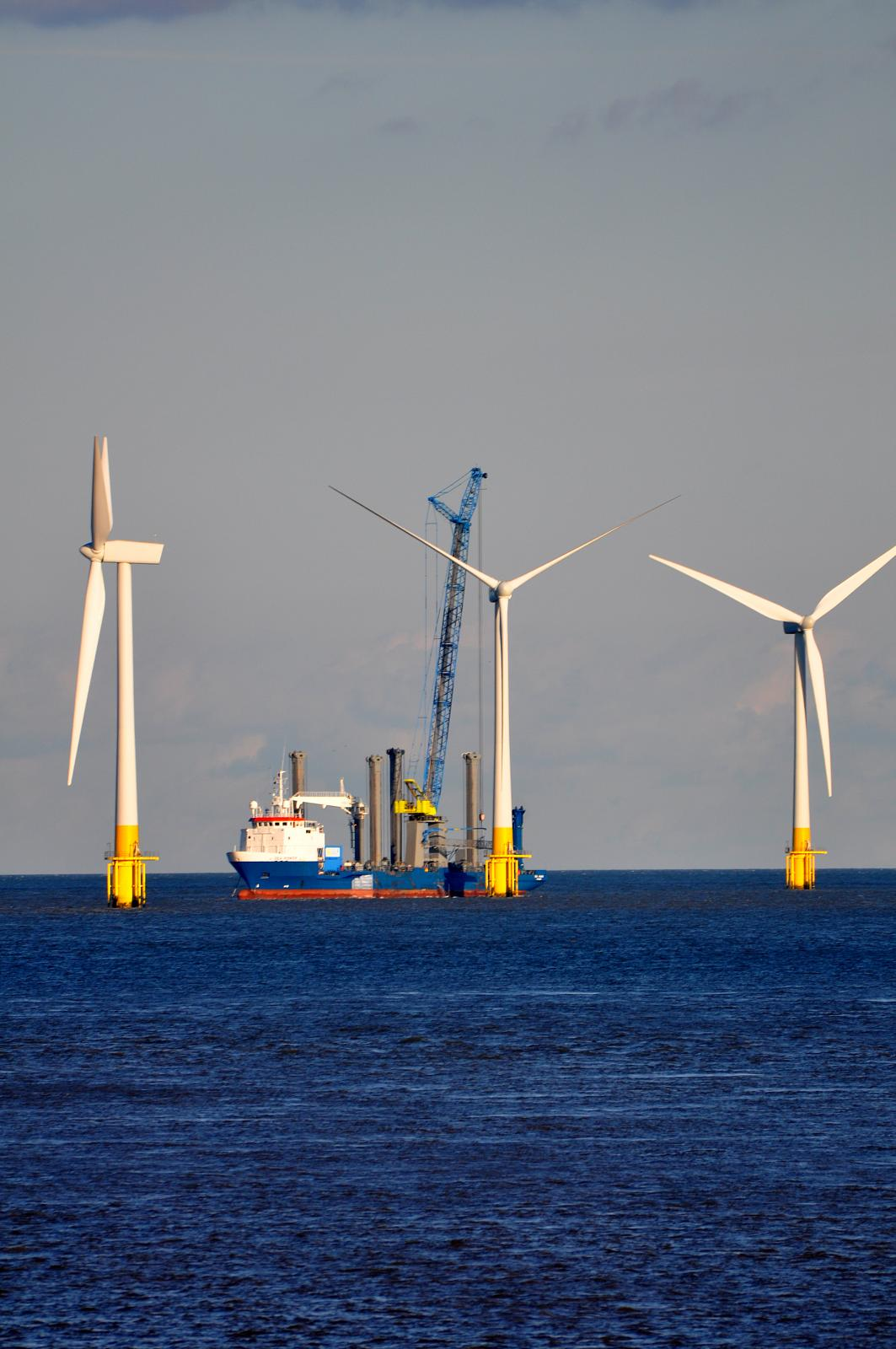
Jackup barge servicing a Vestas V80-2MW wind turbine of the Scribe Sands wind farm.

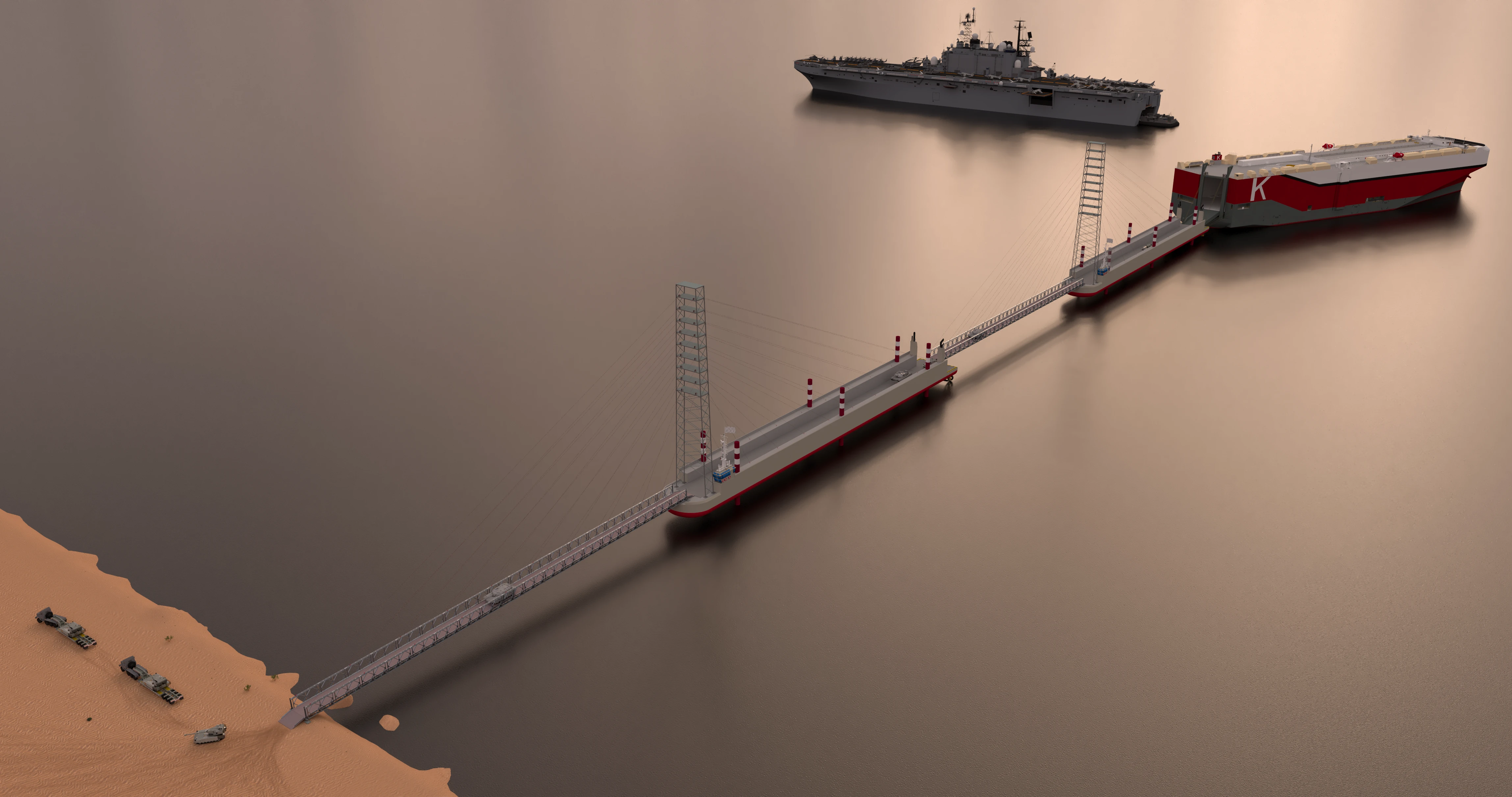
3D design of PLA Navy landing barges

== See also ==
- Crane vessel
- Offshore geotechnical engineering
- Oil platform
- Rack phase difference
- TIV Resolution
