= Rest in Peace (disambiguation) =

Rest in peace is an expression to someone who has died.

Rest in Peace may also refer to:

== Music ==
- "Rest in Peace" (song), a 1992 song by Extreme
- "Rip (Rest in Peace)", a 2023 song by Aidan and Ira Losco
- Rest in Peace: The Final Concert, a live album by English gothic rock band Bauhaus
- "Rest in Peace", a song from the 1977 album I Wanta Sing by George Jones
- "Rest in Peace", a song from the 1991 album Nothing Left to Fear by Destiny
- "Rest in Peace", a song from the 2016 album Yellowcard by Yellowcard
- "Rest in Peace", a song from the 2022 album Gifts from the Holy Ghost by Dorothy

== Other ==
- Rest in Peace (film), a 2024 Argentine thriller film
- "Rest in Peace" (The Walking Dead), a 2022 television episode

== See also ==
- RIP (disambiguation)
- Rest in Pieces (disambiguation)
- Rust in Peace, 1990 album by Megadeth
