= Rack phase difference =

Rack Phase Difference (RPD) is a difference in the elevation between rack teeth of the chords of any single leg of a jackup rig with open truss-type legs. This type of jackup vessel operates with a rack and pinion drive system, as opposed to the pin-hole system found on jackups rigs with tubular legs. The legs are mostly triangular though some with rectangular designs can be found. The chords are connected via a network of bracings to reinforce the leg structure.

When a jackup positions its spudcan - i.e. the shoe mounted at the bottom of the leg - onto the seabed the mass of the vessel pressing down onto the seabed will cause a reaction force. If the seabed is inclined, or the spudcan does not travel straight through the soil due to the consistency of the soil layers encountered during leg penetration, the forces acting on the chords will be unequal, which will cause a chord - and the rack attached to it - to move ever so slightly up or down. This displacement is the Rack Phase Value (RPV), and can be either positive or negative. The sum of the absolute values of the RPV is the Rack Phase Difference.

This relative displacement between the racks causes additional loading on the leg members, which induces additional stresses between

- the rack and pinion teeth that are meshing during the jacking operation, which increases rack and pinion wear
- the rack teeth and the upper and lower leg guides, which increases rack wear on the tips
- the welded connections between bracings and chords

The RPD limit should be clearly defined by the designer of the jack-up rig, and is subject to narrow design and as-built tolerances. The better the design tolerances are followed during construction, the lower the RPD will likely be during jacking operations, and the less wear the system will encounter. Excessive loading may result in failure of structural members in case the RPD reaches more than the allowable value.

- cracks in welds between structural members
- buckling of bracings
- shearing off of rack and pinion teeth
- deformation of the leg guide plate supporting structure
- damage on the drives (e.g. internal planetary gear damage, damage on bull gears, shearing off of shaft keys, ...)

== Reasons ==
1. Eccentricity of Spudcan centre due to uneven ground condition
2. Sliding of leg
