= Ripped =

Ripped may refer to:

- Ripped, a slang term for having achieved muscle hypertrophy
- Ripped: How the Wired Generation Revolutionized Music, a book by Greg Kot
- Ripped, a series of books and DVDs by Clarence Bass
- "Ripped", an episode of Law & Order: Special Victims Unit
- Ripped (film), a 2017 comedy film starring Faizon Love and Russell Peters

== See also ==
- Ripping, the process of copying audio or video content to a hard disk
- RIPD
- Rip (disambiguation)
