= Spudcan =

Base cones

Spudcans are the base cones on mobile-drilling jack-up platform. These inverted cones are mounted at the base of the jack-up and provide stability to lateral forces on the jack-up rig when deployed into ocean-bed systems.

Important calculations for spudcan design include the response to vertical, horizontal and torsional forces on the jack-up leg.
