= Organic Law (Spain) =

Law requiring an absolute majority in the Congress of Deputies

An Organic Law (Spanish: Ley Orgánica) in Spanish law refers to a law related to fundamental rights and freedoms and important institutional areas as defined by the Constitution (including inter alia, statutes of autonomy, referendums and electoral processes, functioning and organisation of the Constitutional Tribunal, the organisation of the military and the succession to the throne). Organic Laws must be passed by an absolute majority of the Congress of Deputies (not merely a majority of those voting). In legal terms, organic laws are conceptually considered part of the constitution.

Prior to the 1978 constitution this concept had no precedent in Spain. It was inspired by a similar concept in the current French Constitution of 1958 and conceived as a democratic safeguard to prevent authoritarian aspirations in the transition to democracy (they are harder to change).

== Organic Law of Francoist Spain ==
The Organic Law of the State in 1967 had set out the structure of the organs of government of Francoist Spain. Together with the other seven Fundamental Laws of the Realm, it was superior to ordinary laws and decrees and could only be changed by referendum. The law was approved by a referendum of 14 December 1966, with the favorable vote of 98.1% of the voters. The fundamental laws were superseded by the 1978 Constitution of Spain, also approved by referendum.

== Definition ==
The Spanish Constitution defines "Organic laws are those related to the development of fundamental rights and public liberties, those that approve Statutes of Autonomy, the electoral processes, and others foreseen in the Constitution."

Spain has various types of laws including:

- organic laws
- ordinary laws
- legislative decrees
- decree-laws
- regulations
- customs
- general principles of law
- case law

The Civil Code provides that laws that contradict another of higher ranking are without legal validity and so implies a hierarchy. Organic laws rank behind the Constitution and international treaties but above all other types of law. However organic laws are also distinguished by the fact of their exclusive subject matter (the principle of jurisdiction) meaning that ordinary laws cannot make provisions for matters that the Constitution requires are to be dealt with by organic laws.

== Examples ==
Concretely, organic laws include the following:

- Those that develop the fundamental rights and public liberties mentioned in Articles 15–29 of the Constitution. For example, the Law on Education (Spanish:Ley Orgánica de Educación) that expands upon Article 27 of the Constitution.
- Statutes of Autonomy. For example, the Statute of Autonomy of Andalusia, Ley Orgánica 2/2007, adopted 19 March 2007.
- The Electoral System Act, in the Ley Orgánica 5/1985, adopted 19 June 1985.
- "...others foreseen in the Constitution." There are a number of matters in the Constitution that presume development by laws. In some cases it is explicit that these are to be developed by Organic Law. For example:

- The basis of military organization

Ley Orgánica 6/1980 (1 July 1980), which regulates basic criteria of National Defense and Military Organization.

- The institution of the Defensor del Pueblo (literally "Public Defender"), a type of ombudsman (Article 54)

Ley Orgánica 3/1981 (6 April 1981), of the Defensor del Pueblo

- Suspension of the rights recognized in Articles 17.2, 18.2 and 18.3 in relation to investigations related to the activities of armed groups or terrorist elements (Article 55.2)

Ley Orgánica 9/1984, (26 December 1984), against the activities of armed groups and terrorist elements, and the development of Article 55.2 of the Constitution

- Abdications and renunciations and any doubt of fact or right that occurs in the line of succession of the throne of Spain (Article 57.5)
- Regulation of the election of Senators (Article 69)

Ley Orgánica 5/1985 (19 June 1985), the Electoral System Act (Ley Orgánica del Régimen Electoral General, LOREG)

- Forms of petitioning by the public for a new law (Article 87.3)

Ley Orgánica 3/1984 (28 March 1984), regulation of popular legislative initiative

- The conduct of referendum foreseen in the Constitution (Article 92.3)

Ley Orgánica 2/1980 (18 January 1980)

- Authorization of international treaties under which an international organization can exercise powers derived from the Constitution (Article 93)

Ley Orgánica 10/1985 (2 August 1985), authorization for the adhesion of Spain to the European Community (later European Union)

- Functions and principles of activity and security and police forces (Article 104.2)

Ley Orgánica 2/1986 (13 March 1986)

- Composition and powers of the Council of State (Consejo de Estado) (Article 107)

Ley Orgánica 3/1980 (22 April 1980) of the Council of State

- Regulation of states of emergency—the Spanish constitution distinguishes a state of alarm, a state of exception, and a state of siege (Article 116.1)

Ley Orgánica 4/1981 (1 June 1981), of states of alarm, exception and siege

- Constitution, functioning and governance of Courts and Tribunals, and the legal status of judges and magistrates and staff for the administration of justice (Article 122.1)

Ley Orgánica 6/1985 (1 July 1985) of judicial power

- The statute of the General Council of the Judicial Power and the regime of incompatibilities of its members and their functions, in particular the matters of appointment, ascent, inspection and disciplinary regime (Article 122)

Ley Orgánica 1/1980 (10 January 1980), of the General Council of the Judicial Power

- Regulation of the naming of the twelve members of the General Council of the Judicial Power who are not nominated by the Congress and Senate (art. 122.3)

Ley Orgánica 1/1980 (10 January 1980), of the General Council of the Judicial Power

- Composition, organization and functions of the Court of Accounts (Article 136.4)

Ley Orgánica 2/1982 (12 May 1982)

- Alteration of provincial borders (Article 141.1)
- Authorization for the constitution of uniprovincial autonomous communities [that is, cases where a single province constitutes an autonomous community] that do not meet the conditions of Article 143.1 (Article 144 a)

Ley Orgánica 6/1982 (7 July 1982), which authorizes the constitution of the Autonomous Community of Madrid

- Authorization or accord of statutes of autonomy for territories that are not made up of provinces (Article 144 b)

Ley Orgánica 1/1995 (13 March 1995), on the Statute of Autonomy of Ceuta
Ley Orgánica 2/1995 (13 March 1995), on the Statute of Autonomy of Melilla

- Substitution of the initiative of local corporations referred to in Article 143.2 (Article 144 c)

Ley Orgánica 13/1980 (16 December 1980), substitution in the province of Almería of the autonomic initiative

- Reform of statutes of autonomy (Article 147.3)

Ley Orgánica 6/2006 (19 July 2006) on the reform of the Statute of Autonomy of Catalonia.

- Coordination of the local police of autonomous communities (Article 148.1.22)

Ley Orgánica 2/1986 (13 March 1986), about security and police forces

- Creation of police forces for the autonomous communities (Article 149.1.29)

Ley Orgánica 2/1986 (13 March 1986), about security and police forces

- Transfer or delegation of state powers (that is, those of Spain itself) to the autonomous communities (Article 150.2)

Ley Orgánica 9/1992 (23 December 1992)

- Regulation of the referendum foreseen in Article 151.1 (Article 151.1)

Ley Orgánica 2/1980 (18 January 1980)

- Regulation for the possibility that in case of the failure to approve a Statute [of autonomy] by one or several provinces via referendum, the other [provinces of that proposed autonomous community] can constitute an autonomous community (Article 151.5)

Ley Orgánica 2/1980 (18 January 1980), about regulation of types of referendum

- Exercise of the financial powers enumerated in Article 157.1, the norms to resolve conflicts that may arise and the possible forms of financial collaboration between the autonomous communities and the State (Article 157.3)

Ley Orgánica 8/1980 (22 September 1980), on the financing of the Autonomous Communities

- Jurisdictional powers of the Constitutional Court of Spain (Article 161.1.d)

Ley Orgánica 2/1979 (3 October 1979), on the Constitutional Court (Ley Orgánica del Tribunal Constitucional - LOTC)

- Definition of the persons and organs that can appear before the Constitutional Court (Article 162.2)

Ley Orgánica 2/1979 (3 October 1979), on the Constitutional Court (LOTC)

- Functioning of the Constitutional Court (Article 165)

Ley Orgánica 2/1979 (3 October 1979), on the Constitutional Court (LOTC)

- Organic Law 1/2004 (28 December 2004) on Comprehensive Protection Measures against Gender Violence
- Adapting the Spanish domestic law of the General Data Protection Regulation

Ley Orgánica 3/2018 (05 December 2018) on Protection of Personal Data and Guarantee of Digital Rights

== Approval ==
The Constitution states that "The approval, modification or derogation of organic laws requires an absolute majority of the Congress, in a final vote over the entire bill." That is to say, an organic law is presented as a bill (by the government) or by the Cortes Generales and must follow the same parliamentary procedures as an ordinary law. As the Constitution indicates, the principal difference in the process is that the Congress of Deputies must make a final vote, at the end of the entire process, where the law must obtain an absolute majority to be approved; for ordinary laws, this final vote is not required.

The Constitution establishes the procedures for proposing a bill before the Cortes. "An organic law will regulate the forms of exercise and requisites for a popular initiative for the presentation of propositions of law. In all cases, no fewer that 500,000 accredited signatures will be required. There shall be no such initiative in matters proper to organic law, treaties or laws of international character, nor in relation to the prerogative of mercy." Therefore, the government, the Congress, the Senate and the legislative assemblies of the autonomous communities can initiate the legislative processes that lead to the approval of an organic law. In contrast, popular initiatives are not permitted in this area.

== Organic law as a source of law ==
In its more than 25 years existence, the Constitutional Court of Spain has made a particularly restrictive interpretation of the matters subject to organic law. The relation of organic law with ordinary law is not a hierarchical relationship but one of jurisdiction or scope.

== See also ==
- Organic Law
- Organic Law of the State, Spanish law of 1967

== Bibliography ==
- Szentgáli-Tóth, Boldizsár (2020). "Organic laws and the principle of democracy in France and Spain" (PDF). Pro Futuro. 9 (4). doi:10.26521/Profuturo/2019/4/6717. ISSN 2063-1987. OCLC 8603896105.
- "The Spanish Constitution" (PDF). Agencia Estatal Boletín Oficial del Estado. 1978.
- Spanish Civil Code (PDF). Ministerio de Justicia. 2016. ISBN 978-84-7787-445-4.
- Ibler, Martin (1999). "Der Grundrechtsschutz in der spanischen Verfassung am Beispiel des Eigentums". JuristenZeitung (in German). 54.
- Prakke, C. A; Kortmann, J. M.; van den Brandhof, J. C. E. (2005). Constitutional law of 15 EU member states (6 ed.). The Hague: Kluwer. ISBN 90-13-01255-8. OCLC 68629764.
- "National Legislation - Spain". European e-Justice Portal. European Commission.
