= Ryp =

Ryp, or RYP, may refer to:

- Juan José Ryp (b.1971), a Spanish comic book artist
- RYP, the National Rail code for Ryde Pier Head railway station on the Isle of Wight, UK
- Ryp (Utrecht) (?-1718), a Christian Hebraist from Utrecht, Netherlands

== See also ==
- Rip (disambiguation)
