= Rip (nickname) =

Rip is a nickname for:

- Rip Bachor (1901–1959), American National Football League player
- Rip Coleman (1931–2004), American Major League Baseball pitcher
- Rip Collins (pitcher) (1896–1968), American Major League Baseball player
- Rip Collins (catcher) (1909–1969), American Major League Baseball backup catcher
- Albin Collins (born 1927), American National Football League player
- Rip Conway (1896–1972), American Major League Baseball player briefly in 1918
- Rip Engle (1906–1983), American football player and coach of football and basketball
- John Salmon Ford (1815–1897), Republic of Texas and American politician, and Confederate Army colonel
- U. L. Gooch (1923–2021), American pilot, aviation entrepreneur and politician
- Rip Hagerman (1888–1930), American Major League Baseball pitcher
- Richard Hamilton (basketball) (born 1978), American National Basketball Association player
- Rip Hawkins (born 1939), American National Football League player
- Rip Jordan (1889–1960), American baseball pitcher
- Rip King (1895–1950), American National Football League player
- Edgar Miller (American football) (1901–1991), American football player, coach and college athletics administrator
- Rip Owens (1894–1970), American football player
- Rip Radcliff (1906–1962), American Major League Baseball player
- Rip Ragan (1878–1953), American Major League Baseball pitcher
- Rip Rapson (born 1952), American attorney and philanthropist, CEO of the Kresge Foundation
- Rip Reukema (1857–1917), American politician
- H. Ripley Rawlings IV, American author and retired Marine Corps lieutenant colonel
- Rip Repulski (1928–1993), American Major League Baseball player
- William "Rip" Robertson (1920–1970), United States Marine Corps major and Central Intelligence Agency case officer
- Rip Russell (1915–1976), American Major League Baseball player
- Rip Scherer (born 1952), American college and National Football League coach and former college quarterback
- Rip Sewell (1907–1989), American Major League Baseball pitcher
- Rip Sullivan (born 1959), American politician and lawyer
- Rip Taylor (1935–2019), American comedian and actor
- Rip Torn (1931–2019), American actor
- Rip Vowinkel (1884–1966), American Major League Baseball pitcher in 1905
- Rip Wade (1898–1957), American Major League Baseball player in 1923
- Ripley B. Weaver (1829–1900), American politician, raiser of stock animals and soldier
- Rip Wheeler (1921–1968), American Major League Baseball pitcher

== See also ==
- Rip (given name)
