= Regional policy dialogue =

The Regional Policy Dialogue (RPD) is an Inter-American Development Bank (IDB) initiative constituted by the bank's board of directors in December 1999. The RPD's objective is to promote knowledge sharing between high-level government officials from Latin America and the Caribbean and experts in key development areas.

== Networks ==
The RPD covers strategic topics for the region through its thirteen networks:

1. Water and Sanitation
2. Climate Change and Disaster Risk Management
3. Trade and Integration
4. Education
5. Energy
6. Results-based Budget Management
7. Innovation, Science and Technology
8. Labor Markets and Social Security
9. Macroeconomic Policy and Finance
10. Social Protection and Health
11. Financial Institutions Regulation
12. Citizen Security
13. Transport

The objective of these networks is to promote the dialogue between public officials that work in the same sector, with the aim to facilitate the exchange of experiences and lessons learned. Through this channel, the main policymakers of the region are able to identify common solutions to the most pressing development issues and increase their intellectual and institutional capital.

== Reports, research and studies ==
To support an effective exchange of expertise and innovative practices, the RPD promotes the presentation of high-quality analytical reports, research, and studies, to be discussed at the networks’ hemispheric and sub-regional meetings.
