= Rip (given name) =

Rip is a masculine given name which may refer to:

- Rip Esselstyn (born 1963), American health activist, food writer, triathlete and former firefighter
- Jeong Rip (c. 1574–1629), a scholar-official of the Korean Joseon Dynasty
- Rip Rense (born 1954), American music and film journalist, author, poet and music producer
- Sin Rip (c. 1546–1592), Korean general
- Rip Van Dam (c. 1660–1749), acting governor of the Province of New York from 1731 to 1732

== See also ==
- Rip (nickname)
