= Ripper (surname) =

Ripper is the surname of:

- Eric Ripper (born 1951), Australian retired politician
- Georgie Ripper (born 1977), English children's book illustrator
- João Guilherme Ripper (born 1959), Brazilian composer, conductor and academic
- Michael Ripper (1913–2000), English actor
- Rudolph von Ripper (1905–1960), Austrian-born American painter, illustrator and soldier
- Velcrow Ripper (born 1963), Canadian documentary filmmaker, writer and public speaker
- William Ripper (1853–1937), British mechanical engineer and academic
