= Ordinary law =

Law lower than the Constitution

An ordinary law is a normal law, generally distinguished from a constitutional law, organic law, or other similar law. Typically, ordinary laws are subordinate to constitutional and organic laws, and are more easily changed than constitutional or organic laws, though that should not be assumed to be the case in all jurisdictions. (For example, the Constitutional Court of Spain has ruled that Spain's Organic Laws are not hierarchically superior to ordinary laws, but simply apply to different matters.) Ordinary laws often govern areas beyond the scope of constitutional or organic laws.

Normally, in a democracy, an ordinary law must first obtain a simple majority of a congress, parliament, or other legislature, and then be signed into law by the representative of executive power. The process leading to a legislative vote may vary vastly from one jurisdiction to another: the process may be initiated by either house of a bicameral legislature or from the sole house of a unicameral legislature; from the head of government or head of state; or by popular initiative. Different jurisdictions may allow ordinary laws to be proposed by one or all of these means, and may have restrictions on which body may take the initiative for certain types of laws (for example, in some bicameral systems, tax-related laws must begin in the lower chamber of the legislature). In some jurisdictions, the legislature has a means to override an executive veto by a supermajority, or the voting populace have the means to override a law by a referendum.

Under federal systems, ordinary laws may be created at the level of a sovereign state but also by its constituent components: for example, by states of the United States or autonomous communities of Spain. An ordinary law needs to be passed by the lower house.
