= Rip (surname) =

Rip is a surname. Notable people with the surname include:

- Arie Rip (born 1941), Dutch social scientist
- Gerald J. Rip (born 1940), former Chief Justice of the Tax Court of Canada
- Willem Cornelis Rip (1856–1922), Dutch artist
