= R.I.P., Rest in Pieces =

1997 documentary about Joe Coleman

R.I.P., Rest in Pieces is a 1997 documentary film which explores the life and career of artist Joe Coleman.
