= Comparison of netbooks =

Comparison article

These tables provide a comparison of netbooks.

Aspects of netbooks that should be considered:

- Mouse layout that is used. Touchpad with 2-buttons below, or touchpad with buttons on each side. The latter may make it hard with some operations needing simultaneous presses.
- Battery capacity and operating time.
- Weight and size. The original concept was below 1 kg but some manufacturers tend toward 2 kg (4.4 lb).
- Noise from CPU fan.
- Driver availability for the built-in hardware.
- Operating system choice.
- Presence of built-in HSDPA, etc., may help to avoid USB dongles.

== Current production ==
=== Legend (weight) ===
Color	Kilograms (kg)	Pounds (lb)
Blue	< 0.9	< 2.0
Green	0.9 → 1.125	2 → 2.5
Yellow	1.125 → 1.5	2.5 → 3.3
Orange	> 1.5	> 3.3
Grey	Variable	Variable
White	Unknown	Unknown

=== Specifications ===
Manufacturer	Model	Weight (kg)	Weight (lb)	Display size (in)	Display resolution	Display DPI (Note: The value is for reference only. Calculated based on Display Resolution in pixels and Display Size (inches).)	CPU	Speed (GHz)	HSDPA	Video chipset	Video connection(s)	Storage type	Storage (GB)	RAM (GB)	Battery life (h) minimum	Battery life (h) maximum	Keyboard size in % (Note: The keyboard % value appears to be a percentage of the key-left-side to key-left-side distance (or key pitch) of 19mm of a 'standard' keyboard, as discussed in the Article's Talk subsection Talk:Comparison of netbooks#keyboard size.)	Camera	Mouse layout	Linux OS choice(s)	Windows OS choice(s)	Manual, DataSheet
Acer
Acer Inc.	Aspire One	0.99, 1.26	2.18, 2.77	8.9 - 11.6	1024×600, 1366×768; WSVGA LED glossy	133-135	Atom	1.6		GMA 950	VGA	SSD + SDHC, HDD	8, 16; 120, 160, 25	0.5, 1, 2	3 (3-cell)	6–7 (6-cell)	?	Built-in	Touchpad, buttons on each side	Linpus	7 Starter Edition	
Always Innovating
Always Innovating	Touch Book	0.675/1.418 (Note: The Touch Book has a detachable keyboard with a secondary battery.)	1.488/3.126	8.9	1024×600 touchscreen	133-102	OMAP3530	0.6		PowerVR SGX530 GPU + 430 MHz C64x+ DSP	None	Removable SD card	8	0.25	3-5 (tablet only, 6000 mAh)	10-15 (with keyboard, 12000 mAh)	95%	None	Touchpad 2-buttons below	Ångstrom, Ubuntu, Android	CE/not x86 based	
Aigo
Aigo	MID P8880T	0.34	0.75	4.8	800×480	194	Atom	0.8	TD	GMA 500	VGA	SSD + SDHC, HDD	8, 16; 120	0,5 or 1	3 (3-cell)	6–7 (6-cell)		3.2 MP	Touchscreen		XP	
Archos
Archos	Archos 10	1.23	2.7	10.2	1024×600	116	Atom N270	1.6		GMA 950	VGA	HDD	160	1				1.3 MP	Touchpad 2-buttons below		XP	
Manufacturer	Model	Weight (kg)	Weight (lb)	Display size (in)	Display resolution	Display DPI	CPU	Speed (GHz)	HSDPA	Video chipset	Video connection(s)	Storage type	Storage (GB)	RAM (GB)	Battery life (h) minimum	Battery life (h) maximum	Keyboard size in %	Camera	Mouse layout	Linux/Unix OS choice(s)	Windows OS choice(s)	Manual, DataSheet
Asus
Asus	Eee PC 701SD	0.905	2.00	7	800×480 WVGA matte	133	Celeron-M ULV 353	0.9	?	?	VGA	SSD	8	0.5	3.4	3.5	83%	0.3 MP	?	Linux	XP Home	
Asus	Eee PC 900	0.99	2.18	8.9	1024×600; WSVGA matte	133	Celeron-M ULV 353	0.9		?	VGA	SSD	12, 16, 20	1	3.5 (4-cell)	3.5 (4-cell)	83%	1.3 MP	Touchpad 2-buttons below	Xandros	XP	
Asus	Eee PC 900A	0.99	2.18	8.9	1024×600; WSVGA matte	133	Atom N270	1.6		GMA 950	VGA	SSD	4, 8, 16	1	3.5 (4-cell)	3.5 (4-cell)	83%	None, 0.3 MP	Touchpad 2-buttons below	Xandros	XP	
Asus	Eee PC 900HA	1.23	2.7	8.9	1024×600; WSVGA matte	133	Atom N270	1.6		GMA 3150	VGA	HDD	160	1	3.5 (4-cell)	10400 mAh 7.5hr (8-cell)	83%	0.3 MP	Touchpad 2-buttons below	?	Windows XP	
Asus	Eee PC 901	1.14	2.51	8.9	1024×600; WSVGA matte	133	Atom N270	1.6	PCB sockets present. Mod option.	GMA 950	VGA	SSD + SDHC	12, 20	1-2	4.2	7.8	83%	1.3 MP	Touchpad 2-buttons below	Xandros	XP	
Asus	Eee PC 904HD	1.40	3.09	8.9	1024×600 WVGA	133	Celeron-M	0.9		?	VGA	HDD	80	1	?	?	?	?		?	XP	
Asus	Eee PC 1000	1.45	3.19	10.1	1024×600; WSVGA matte	117	Atom N270	1.6		945 GME	VGA	SSD + SDHC, HDD	40, 80, 120, 160	1, 2	4.2	7.8	92%	?		Xandros	XP	
Asus	Eee PC 1000HE	1.45	3.20	10.1	1024×600; WSVGA matte	117	Atom N280	1.66		GMA 950	VGA	HDD	160	1, 2	?	9.5	92%	1.3 MP	Touchpad 2-buttons below	None	XP Home	
Asus	Eee PC 1001HA	1.1	2.4	10.1	1024×600; WSVGA, matte	117	Atom N270	1.6		GMA 950	VGA	HDD	160	1, 2 (one slot, field upgradable)	4 (3-cell, 2200mAh, 23Wh)	8 (6-cell, 4600mAh, 48Wh)	92%	0.3 MP	Touchpad 2-buttons below, multitouch	GNU	XP Home	
Asus	Eee PC 1005HA-PU1X (Note: There are three models of the Asus Eee PC 1005HA with different specs, the -B, -V and -P. Only the -P model is shown. The -V model has a matte screen, Atom N270 (1.6 GHz), 6 cell battery that will last up to 8.5 hours and 0.3 MP webcam.)	1.27	2.81	10.1	1024×600; WSVGA, glossy	117	Atom N280	1.66		GMA 950	VGA	HDD	160 + 10 Eee storage	1, 2 (one slot, field upgradable)		10.5 (6-cell, 5600mAh, 63Wh)	92%	1.3 MP	Touchpad 2-buttons below, multitouch	None	XP Home	
Asus	Eee PC 1001PX-EU0X	1.1	2.42 (with 3 cell battery?)	10.1	1024×600; WSVGA, matte	117	Atom N450	?		Intel UMA	VGA	HDD	160 (XP), 250 (Win 7) + 10 Eee storage	1, 2 (one slot, field upgradable	4.5 (3 cell, 23Wh)	9 (6-cell, 48Wh)	95%	0.3 MP	Touchpad 2-buttons below, multitouch	None	XP Home or 7 Starter	
Asus	Eee PC 1008HA	1.09	2.40	10.1	1024×600; WSVGA glossy	117	Atom N280	1.66		GMA 950	VGA	HDD	160 + 10 Eee storage	1, 2	?	6.0	92%	1.3 MP		GNU	XP Home	
Asus	Eee PC 1015P	1.1, 1.25		10.1	1024x600 WSVGA	117	Intel Atom N450	?		?	VGA	HDD	?	1 - 2 (DDR2)	5 (3-cell, 23Wh)	9 (6-cell, 48Wh)	?	0.3 MP	Touchpad 2-buttons below	-	7 Starter	Eee PC 1015P Manual
Asus	Eee PC 1015PD	1.1, 1.25		10.1	1024x600 WSVGA	117	Intel Atom N455, N475	?		NVIDIA ION N11M-PT1	VGA	HDD	160, 250, 320 + Web storage (1 year)	1 - 2 (DDR3)	4.5 (3-cell, 23Wh)	13 (6-cell, 63Wh)	?	0.3 MP	Touchpad 2-buttons below	-	7 Starter	Eee PC 1015PD Manual
Asus	Eee PC 1015PE	1.1, 1.25		10.1	1024x600 WSVGA	117	Intel Atom N550	1.5		?	VGA	HDD	160, 250, 320 + Web storage (500 GB)	1 - 2 (DDR2)	5 (6-cell, 23Wh)	13.5 (6-cell, 63Wh)	?	0.3 MP	Touchpad 2-buttons below	-	7 Starter	Eee PC 1015PE Manual
Asus	Eee PC 1015PED	1.1, 1.25		10.1	1024x600 WSVGA	117	Intel Atom N455, N475	?		?	VGA	HDD	160, 250, 320 + Web storage (500 GB)	1 - 2 (DDR3)	4.5 (3-cell, 23Wh)	13 (6-cell, 63Wh)	?	0.3 MP	Touchpad 2-buttons below	-	7 Starter	Eee PC 1015PED Manual
Asus	Eee PC 1015PEM	1.27		10.1	1024x600 WSVGA	117	Intel Atom N550	1.5		?	VGA	HDD	160, 250, 320 + Web storage (500 GB)	1 - 2 (DDR3)	10 (6-cell, 48Wh)	13 (6-cell, 63Wh)	?	0.3 MP	Touchpad 2-buttons below	-	7 Starter	Eee PC 1015PEM Manual
Asus	Eee PC 1015PN	1.25		10.1	1024x600 WSVGA	117	Intel Atom N570	?		NVIDIA ION N11M-PT1	VGA, HDMI	HDD	250 + Web storage (500 GB)	1 - 2 (DDR3)	8 (6-cell, 47Wh)	10 (6-cell, 56Wh)	?	0.3 MP	Touchpad 2-buttons below	-	7 Home Premium, 7 Starter	Eee PC 1015PN Manual
Asus	Eee PC 1015T	1.25		10.1	1024x600 WSVGA	117	AMD APU?	?		?	VGA	HDD	160, 250, 320	1 - 4 (DDR3)	6 (6-cell, 48Wh)	7.5 (6-cell, 63Wh)	?	0.3 MP	Touchpad 2-buttons below	-	7 Starter	Eee PC 1015T Manual
Asus	Eee PC 1015B	1.28, 1.3		10.1	1024x600 WSVGA	117	AMD APU C30, C50	1.2, 1.0		AMD Radeon HD 6250	VGA, HDMI	HDD	250, 320, 500 + Web storage	1 - 2 (DDR3)	3 (3-cell, 2200mAh, 23Wh)	8.5 (6-cell, 5200mAh, 56Wh)	?	0.3 MP	Touchpad 2-buttons below	-	7 Starter	Eee PC 1015B Manual
Asus	Eee PC 1015BX	1.17, 1.29		10.1	1024x600 WSVGA	117	AMD APU C30, C50, C60	1.2, 1.0		AMD Radeon HD 6250, 6290	VGA, HDMI	HDD	250, 320, 500 + 3 (Web storage)	1 - 2 (DDR3)	3 (3-cell, 2200mAh, 23Wh)	7.5 (6-cell, 5200mAh, 56Wh)	?	0.3 MP	Touchpad 2-buttons below	-	7 Starter	Eee PC 1015BX Manual
Asus	Eee PC 1015CX	1.1, 1.25		10.1	1024x600 WSVGA	117	Intel Atom N2600	1.6		Intel NM10 (Chipset)	VGA, HDMI	HDD	320, 500	1 - 2 (DDR3)	5 (3-cell, 23Wh)	11 (6-cell, 47Wh)	?	0.3 MP	Touchpad 2-buttons below	-	7 Starter	Eee PC 1015CX Manual
Asus	Eee PC 1016P	1.13, 1.27		10.1	1024x600 WSVGA	117	Intel Atom N455	1.66		Intel NM10 (Chipset)	VGA	HDD	160, 250, 320	1 - 2 (DDR3)	4.5 (3-cell, 23Wh)	13 (6-cell, 63Wh)	?	0.3 MP	Touchpad 2-buttons below	-	7 Pro; 7 Home Premium	Eee PC 1016P Manual
Asus	Eee PC T91	0.9	2.1	8.9	1024×600; WSVGA touchscreen	133	Atom Z520	1.33		GMA 500	VGA	SSD + SDHC	16 + 20 Eee storage	1	(Internal LiPo,? cell, 3850 mAh)	4.0	92%	0.3 MP	Touchpad 2-buttons below	?	XP Home	
Asus	Eee PC T91MT	0.96	2.1	8.9	1024×600; WSVGA touchscreen	133	Atom Z520	1.33		GMA 500	VGA	SSD + SDHC	32 + 500 Eee storage	1	(Internal LiPo,? cell, 3850 mAh)	5.0	92%	0.3 MP	Touchpad 2-buttons below	?	7 Home	
Asus	Eee PC T101MT	1.3	2.86	10.1	1024×600; WSVGA touchscreen	117	Intel Atom N450, N570	1.66		GMA 3150	VGA	HDD + SDXC	160/320 + 500 Eee storage	1, 2	LiPo,4 cell,?, 4900 mAh 35 Wh)	6.5	?	0.3 MP	Touchpad 2-buttons below	?	7 S/HB/HP	
Asus	Eee PC 1225B	1.44		11.6	1366x768 WXGA	135	AMD APU E450, C60	1.65, 1.0		AMD Radeon HD 6320, 6290	VGA, HDMI	HDD	320, 500, 750 + 3 (Web storage)	1 - 4 (DDR3)	7 (6-cell, 56Wh)	7 (6-cell, 56Wh)	?	0.3 MP	Touchpad 2-buttons below	-	7 Home Premium	Eee PC 1225B Manual
Asus	Eee PC 1225C	1.45		11.6	1366x768 WXGA	135	Intel Atom N2600, N2800	1.6, 1.86		?	VGA, HDMI	HDD	320, 500	1 - 2 (DDR3)	5 (3-cell, 2.6Ah)	7.5 (6-cell, 2.2Ah)	?	0.3 MP	Touchpad 2-buttons below	Ubuntu	-	Eee PC 1225C Manual
Asus	Eee PC 1215P	1.45		12.1	1366x768 WXGA	129	Intel Atom N550	1.5		?	VGA	HDD	250, 320	1 - 2 (DDR)	8 (6-cell)	8 (6-cell)	?	0.3 MP	Touchpad 2-buttons below	-	7 Home Premium, 7 Starter	Eee PC 1215P Manual
Asus	Eee PC 1215B	1.45		12.1	1366x768 WXGA	129	AMD APU E450, E350, C30, C50, C60	1.65, 1.6, 1.2, 1.0		AMD Radeon HD 6320, 6310, 6250, 6290	VGA, HDMI	HDD	250, 320, 500 + 3 (Web storage)	1 - 4 (DDR3)	8 (6-cell, 56Wh)	8 (6-cell, 56Wh)	?	0.3 MP	Touchpad 2-buttons below	?	7 Home Premium	Eee PC 1215B Manual
Asus	Eee PC 1215N	1.45		12.1	1366x768 WXGA	129	Intel Atom D525	1.8		?	VGA, HDMI	HDD	250, 320 + Web storage	1 - 4 (DDR)	6 (6-cell)	6 (6-cell)	?	0.3 MP	Touchpad 2-buttons below	-	7 Home Premium	Eee PC 1215N Manual
Asus	Eee PC 1215T	1.45		12.1	1490x900 WXGA+	147	AMD Athlon II Neo K125	1.7		AMD HD 4250	VGA, HDMI	HDD	250, 320	1 - 2 (DDR3)	? (6-cell)	? (6-cell)	?	0.3 MP	Touchpad 2-buttons below	-	7 Home Premium	Eee PC 1215T Manual
Averatec
Averatec	Buddy	1.19	2.62	10.2	?	?	Atom	1.6		?	VGA	HDD	160	1	?	?	?	?		?	XP	
Axioo	Pico	1.2	2.6	10	1024×600; WSVGA	118	Atom N270	1.6		?	?	HDD	120	1 (Note: The Pico has 1 GiB onboard memory with an additional empty slot, with up to 2GiB capacity.)	? (3 cells, 2200 mAh)	? (6 cells, 5200 mAh)	?	?		?	XP	
BELCO	450R	0.75	1.65	7	800x480	133	DM&P PDX-600 (Vortex86dx, i486DX compatible)	1		XGI Z9s (no 3D acceleration)	?	SSD	4/8	0.5	? 2000 mAh	?	?	?		?	?	
BenQ
BenQ	Joybook Lite U101	1.05	2.31	10.1	1024×576 WSVGA; 16:9 LED glossy	117	Atom N270	1.66		GMA 950	VGA	SSD+HDD	4 (SSD) 80, 120, 160 (HDD)	1.5, 2.5 (512MB built in)	?	4	90%	?		Linux Lite	XP Home	
Datacask	Jupiter 1014a	1.25	2.75	10.2	1024x600	116	Atom	1.6		GMA 945	VGA	HDD	80, 160	0.5, 1, 2	4 (4000 mAh)	?	83%	1.3 MP	Touchpad 2-buttons below	Knoppix Variant	XP	
Manufacturer	Model	Weight (kg)	Weight (lb)	Display size (in)	Display resolution	Display DPI	CPU	Speed (GHz)	HSDPA	Video chipset	Video connection(s)	Storage type	Storage (GB)	RAM (GB)	Battery life (h) minimum	Battery life (h) maximum	Keyboard size in %	Camera	Mouse layout	Linux/Unix OS choice(s)	Windows OS choice(s)	Manual, DataSheet
Dell
Dell	Mini 9	1.06	2.34	8.9	1024×600; WSVGA glossy	133	Atom	1.6		GMA 950	VGA	SSD + SDHC	4, 8, 16, 32, 64	0.5, 1, 2 (one slot, field upgradable)	3.5 (4-cell)	3.5 (4-cell)	83%	?	Touchpad 2-buttons below	Dell Ubuntu NBR	XP	
Dell	Mini 10	1.3	2.86	10	1366x768 1024x576	156 117	Atom	1.3, 1.6		GMA 500	HDMI (VGA on 10v)	HDD	120, 160	1			92%	?		Dell Ubuntu NBR	XP	
Dell	Mini 12	1.24	2.73	12.1	1200x800	119	Atom	1.3, 1.6		GMA 500	VGA	HDD	60, 80	1	3 (3-cell)	6.5 (6-cell)	91.9%	?	Touchpad 2-buttons below	Ubuntu NBR	Vista Home Basic	
Dell	Latitude 2100	1.54	3.4	10.1	1024x576	116	Atom	1.6		GMA 950	VGA	SSD or HDD	16(ssd), 80, 180, 250	.5 1 1.5 2 (one slot, field upgradable)	2.24 (3-cell)	4.47 (6-cell)	89%	?		Ubuntu	XP	
Dell	Latitude 2120	1.54	3.4	10.1	1024x600 Wide SVGA matte	116	Intel Atom N550	1.5		GMA 3150 8MB	VGA	SSD or HDD	16(ssd), 80, 180, 250	.5 1 1.5 2 (one slot, field upgradable)	2.24 (3-cell)	4.47 (6-cell)	89%	1.3 MP	Touchpad 2-buttons below	Ubuntu	XP	2120 Service Manual BIOS Setup Features
E-Lead
E-Lead	Noahpad	0.78	1.72	7	800×480; WVGA	133	C7-M	1		?	?	HDD	30	0.5	?	?	?	?		Ubuntu	?	
Elonex
Elonex	ONE	1.00	2.20	7.0	800×480 WVGA	133	LNX Code 8	0.3		?	None	SSD	1	0.125	?	?	?	?		Linos	?	
eMachines
eMachines	E350	1.25	2.75	10.1	1024x600	116	Atom N450	1.66		GMA 3150	VGA	HDD	160	1	3 (3-cell)	6.5 (6-cell)	92%	1.3 MP	Touchpad 2-buttons below	N/A	XP	
EMTEC
EMTEC	Gdium	1.2	2.64	10	1024x600 WVGA	118	MIPS Loongson 2F	0.9		?	VGA	G-Key removable USB Flash	16	0.5		?	?	?	?	Mandriva G-Linux	None (not x86 based)	
Everex
Everex	CloudBook	0.91	2.00	7	800×480; WVGA	133	C7-M ULV	1.2		UniChrome Pro IGP	DVI-I	HDD	30	0.5	?	?	?	?		gOS Rocket	?	
Manufacturer	Model	Weight (kg)	Weight (lb)	Display size (in)	Display resolution	Display DPI	CPU	Speed (GHz)	HSDPA	Video chipset	Video connection(s)	Storage type	Storage (GB)	RAM (GB)	Battery life (h) minimum	Battery life (h) maximum	Keyboard size in %	Camera	Mouse layout	Linux/Unix OS choice(s)	Windows OS choice(s)	Manual, DataSheet
Gateway
Gateway	LT2001u, LT2021u	1.18	2.62	10.1	1024×600	117	Atom	1.6	?	?	VGA	HDD	160	1	(3-Cell Li)	(3-Cell Li)	?	0.3	Touchpad with 1 button below	N/A	Windows XP Home	
Gateway	LT3103u, LT3114u	1.38	3.04	11.6	1366×768	135	Athlon 64	1.2		Radeon X1270	VGA	HDD	250	2	5 (6-cell Li)	5 (6-cell Li)		0.3	Touchpad with 1-button below	N/A	Vista Home Basic	
Gigabyte
Gigabyte Technology	M912	1.3	2.86	8.9	1280x768 WXGA touchscreen	167	Atom	1.6		?	None	HDD	120, 160, 250	1, 2	?	?	?	?		Ubuntu	XP	
Gigabyte	M912X	1.35	2.97	8.9	1280×768	167	Atom	1.6		?	VGA	HDD	80	1	?	?	?	?		?	XP	
Hillman	IA1001	1.26	2.77	10.2	1024x600	116	Atom N270	1.6		GMA 950		HDD	160	1	2 (3-cell)			1.3 MP	Touchpad 2-buttons below	Linux		
Hewlett-Packard (HP)
HP	Mini note 2133	1.27	2.79	8.9	1280×800; WXGA glossy	169	C7-M	1–1.6		?	VGA	SSD, HDD	4, 120, 160	0.5–2	2 (3-cell)	4 (6-cell)	92%	?		Suse	XP, Vista	
HP	Mini note 2140	1.19	2.62	10.1	1024x576 1366x768	116 155	Atom N270	1.6		GMA 950	?	SSD, HDD	80, 160	1-2	4 (3-cell)	8 (6-cell)	92%	?	Touchpad buttons on each side	Suse	Vista, XP	
HP	HP Mini 5101	1.20	2.64	10.1	1024x600 1366x768	117 155	Atom N280	1.667		GMA 950	VGA	SSD, HDD	80, 128, 160, 250, 320	1-2	4.5 (4-cell)	9 (6-cell)	92%	2MP	Touchpad buttons below	Suse	XP Home	
Impulse, a division of Carapelli Computers Limited	NPX-9000	0.72	1.58	7	480x324	82	X-Scale ARM	0.4		?	?	NAND	1	0.125	2100 mAh LiP	?	80%	?		Linux 2.4 based Highne 2008, Xenium	None (non-x86 based)	
Intel
Intel, ECS	Classmate PC	1.45	3.20	7	800×480; WVGA matte	133	Celeron-M	0.9		?	None	NAND	2	0.25	?	?	?	?		Mandriva, Debian	XP	
Inventec
Inventec	Kohjinsha SC3	0.798	1.76	7	1024x600	169	Atom	1.33		?	?	SSD	?	?	?	?	?	?		?	Vista Ultimate	
Inventec	Kohjinsha SX3	1.2	2.64	8.9	1280x768	168	Atom	1.3		?	?	SSD	?	?	?	?	?	?		?	Vista	
Manufacturer	Model	Weight (kg)	Weight (lb)	Display size (in)	Display resolution	Display DPI	CPU	Speed (GHz)	HSDPA	Video chipset	Video connection(s)	Storage type	Storage (GB)	RAM (GB)	Battery life (h) minimum	Battery life (h) maximum	Keyboard size in %	Camera	Mouse layout	Linux/Unix OS choice(s)	Windows OS choice(s)	Manual, DataSheet
Lemote
Lemote	Lemote YeeLoong (?)	1.0	2.2	8.9	1024×600; WSVGA	133	Loongson	0.9		SM 712	VGA	HDD/SSD	160	1	2.5 (3-cell)	5.5 (6-cell)	95%	?		Debian	None (not x86 based)	
Lenovo
Lenovo	IdeaPad S10	1.1, 1.3	2.43, 2.87	10.2	1024×600; WSVGA matte	116	Atom	1.6		GMA 950	VGA	HDD	160	1	3 (3-cell)	6 (6-cell)	85%	1.3MP		SUSE Linux (no longer offered Apr 2009)	XP, 7	
LG
LG	LG X110 (OEM version of MSI Wind) (Note: The Medion Akoya Mini has similar specifications to the Linux model of the MSI Wind PC)	1.19	2.62	10	1024×600; WSVGA matte	118	Atom	1.6		?	?	HDD	80, 120, 160	0.5, 1	?	?	?	?		?	XP	
LG	Xnote B8310	0.59	1.30	4.8	800×480	194	Atom	?		?	?	HDD	?	1	?	?	?	?		?	?	
Maxdata Belinea
Maxdata Belinea	S-Book	1.0	2.2	8.9	?	?	C7-M	1–1.2		?	?	SSD	?	?	?	?	?	?		?	Vista	
Medion
Medion	Akoya E1210 Mini (OEM version of MSI Wind)	1.2	2.65	10	1024×600; WSVGA matte	118	Atom	1.6		?	VGA	HDD	80, 160	1	?	?	?	?		?	XP	
Micro-Star International (MSI)
MSI	Wind U100	1.04, 1.18	2.29, 2.6	10	1024×600; WSVGA matte	118	Atom	0.8 ~ 1.6, 2.0 oc.		GMA 950	VGA	HDD	80, 120, 160	0.5, 1	2.5 (3-cell)	5.5 (6-cell)	95%	1.3MP		Suse	XP	
MSI	Wind U120	1.10	2.42	10	1024×600; WSVGA	118	Atom	1.6		?	VGA	HDD, SSD	80/160	1	?	?	?	?		?	XP	
NetColors	Mini 10-N270	0.99, 1.26	2.18, 2.77	8.9	1024×600; WSVGA, glossy	133	Atom N270	1.6		GMA 950	?	SSD + SDHC, HDD	16, 32; 160, 320	1GB, 2GB	3 (3-cell)	6–7 (6-cell)	89%	?		Ubuntu	XP	
NTT System	Corrino 100A	1.2	2.65	10.2	1024×600	116	Geode LX800	0.5		?	?	HDD	60	1	? Li-Po	? Li-Po (4200 mAh)	?	?		Unspecified	XP	
One	A110	0.95	2.1	7	800x480	133	C7	1.0		S3 VX800	VGA	SSD, HDD	2, 4; 60	0.5	?	?	?	?		Linpus	XP	
One	A440	1.2	2.6	10.2	1024x600	116	C7	1.6		?	?	HDD	80	1	? (3 cells, 2200 mAh)	?	?	?		Linpus	XP	
Nokia
Nokia	Booklet 3G	1.2	2.6	10.1	1280×720	?	Intel Atom Z530	1.6	?	?	?	HDD	120	1024	No	?	?	?	?	?	7	
Manufacturer	Model	Weight (kg)	Weight (lb)	Display size (in)	Display resolution	Display DPI	CPU	Speed (GHz)	HSDPA	Video chipset	Video connection(s)	Storage type	Storage (GB)	RAM (GB)	Battery life (h) minimum	Battery life (h) maximum	Keyboard size in %	Camera	Mouse layout	Linux/Unix OS choice(s)	Windows OS choice(s)	Manual, DataSheet
Packard Bell
Packard Bell	Easy Note XS	?	?	7.0	1024×600 WVGA	169	C7-M	1.2		?	?	HDD	30	1	?	?	?	?		?	XP, Vista	
OpenPandora
OpenPandora	Pandora	0.30	0.66	4.3	800x480	216	OMAP3530	0.6-0.9		PowerVR SGX 530	None	Dual SDHC slots	N/A	0.25	10+hrs (4000 mAh)	? (4000 mAh)	?%	?		?	?	
PCWorld	Advent 4211 (OEM version of MSI Wind)	1.2	2.6	10	1024×600; WSVGA matte	118	Atom	1.6		?	VGA	HDD	80	1	2.5 (3-cell)	5.5 (6-cell)	95%	?		?	?	
PROLiNK	Glee TA-009	1.1	2.42	10.1	1024×600 WSVGA	117	Atom	1.6	HSUPA 3.75G; DL: 7.2M; UL: 5.2M optional	GMA 950	VGA	HDD	160	1	2.5 (3-cell)	5.5 (6-cell)	95%	1.3 MP	Touchpad buttons on each side	Ubuntu optional	XP optional	
Quanta Computer	OLPC XO-1	1.45	3.19	7.5	1200×900	200	Geode LX700	0.433		?	None	NAND	1	0.25	?	?	?	?		Fedora	XP	
Raon Digital	Everun Note	0.8	1.76	7	1024×600	169	Turion 64 X2	1.2		?	?	SSD, HDD	16, 24; 30, 60, 80	1	?	?	?	?		Ubuntu	XP	
Manufacturer	Model	Weight (kg)	Weight (lb)	Display size (in)	Display resolution	Display DPI	CPU	Speed (GHz)	HSDPA	Video chipset	Video connection(s)	Storage type	Storage (GB)	RAM (GB)	Battery life (h) minimum	Battery life (h) maximum	Keyboard size in %	Camera	Mouse layout	Linux/Unix OS choice(s)	Windows OS choice(s)	Manual, DataSheet
Samsung
Samsung	N120	1.28	2.8	10.2	1024x600 glossy LED	116	Atom 280	1.6		GMA 950	VGA	HDD	160	1	8 (6-cell)	11 (9-cell)	93%	?		?	XP	
Samsung	N110	1.3	2.9	10.2	1024x600 glossy	116	Atom	1.6		GMA 950	VGA	HDD	160	1	4.6 (6-cell)	7.5 (6-cell)	93%	?		?	XP	
Samsung	NC10 (Note: The Samsung NC10 uses a IEC 60320 C5 connector with 3x1.5 mm² cable to Type E/F mains connector.)	1.3	2.9	10.2	1024x600 matte	116	Atom N270	1.6		GMA 950	VGA	HDD	160	1	4.6 (6-cell)	7.5 (6-cell)	93%	1.3		?	XP	
Samsung	NC20	1.5	3.3	12.1	1280x800 glossy	124	Nano	1.3+		VIA VX800	VGA	HDD	160	1	?	?	97%	?		?	XP	
Samsung	NB30	1.24	2.73	10.1	1024x600 WSVGA matte LED		Atom N450	1.66	no	Intel GMA3150	VGA	HDD + removable SDHC	250	1, 2 (one slot, field upgradable)		10.5 (6-cell, 66Wh, 5900mAh)		0.3 MP?	Touchpad 2-buttons below, multitouch		7 Starter	
Samsung	N220	1.32	2.91	10.1	1024x600 WSVGA matte LED		Atom N450	1.66	no	Intel GMA3150	VGA	HDD + removable SDHC	250	1, 2 (one slot, field upgradable)		11		0.3 MP?	Touchpad 2-buttons below, multitouch		7 Starter	
Sharp
Sharp	Willcom D4	0.47	1.03	5	1024×768	256	Atom	1.6		?	?	HDD	?	1	?	?	?	?		?	?	
Sinomanic	Tianhua GX-1C	?	?	8.4	1280x1024 SXGA	195	Loongson I	0.4 – 0.6		?	?	HDD	40	0.125	?	?	?	?		Debian	None (not x86 based)	
Skytone	HiVision NB0700	0.72	1.59	7.0	800×480 WVGA	133	MIPS Jz4730	0.4		?	?	SSD	1	?	?	?	?	?		Custom	None (not x86 based)	
Skytone, 3K	Razorbook	0.72	1.59	7	800×480	133	XBurst MIPS	0.4		?	?	NAND	4	0.5	3 (2-cell)	3 (2-cell)	?	?		?	None (not x86 based) Windows CE only	
Skytone	Skytone Alpha-400	0.72	1.59	7	800×480	133	XBurst MIPS	0.4		?	None (VGA on some models)	NAND	1	0.125	3 (2-cell)	3 (2-cell)	?	?		Linux 2.4	None (not x86 based)	
Sony
Sony	P-Series	0.64	1.41	8	1600x768	221	Atom	1.3		GMA 500	?	SSD/HDD	128/64/60	2	3:08 CNet video playback	?	88%	?		?	Vista	
System76
System76	Starling Netbook 4	0.907	2.0	10.1	1024x600	117	Intel Atom N550	1.5		Intel GMA 3150	One VGA	SSD/HDD	250/320/500/600HDD 40/80/120/160SSD	2	3 (3-cell)	6 (6-cell)	95%	0.3 MP	Touchpad 2-buttons below (50/50%)	Ubuntu Netbook Edition 10.04	None	
Sylvania Computers	G Netbook	0.85	1.87	7	800×480	133	C7-M ULV	1.2		?	?	HDD	30	1	?	?	?	?		Ubuntu	XP	
Manufacturer	Model	Weight (kg)	Weight (lb)	Display size (in)	Display resolution	Display DPI	CPU	Speed (GHz)	HSDPA	Video chipset	Video connection(s)	Storage type	Storage (GB)	RAM (GB)	Battery life (h) minimum	Battery life (h) maximum	Keyboard size in %	Camera	Mouse layout	Linux/Unix OS choice(s)	Windows OS choice(s)	Manual, DataSheet
Toshiba
Toshiba	AC100	0.87	1.91	10.1 LED	1024×600	117	Tegra 250	1.0	No	Tegra 250	HDMI	SSD	8	512 MB	7	48	?	1.3 MP	Touchpad	Android 2.1 to 2.2	none (non-x86)	
Toshiba	NB100	1.00	2.20	8.9	1024x640	135	Atom	1.6		GMA 950	VGA	HDD	80 (Linux), 120 (XP)	0.5 (Linux), 1 (XP), up to 2 GB	(4 cell)	?	?	1.3 MP	Touchpad 2-buttons below (60/40%)	Ubuntu Netbook Remix	XP	
Toshiba	NB105	?	?	8.9 LED	?	?	Atom	1.6		?	?	HDD	120	1	?	?	?	?		?	XP	
Toshiba	NB200	1.15	2.32	10.1 LED	1024×600	117	Atom N280	1.66		GMA 950	VGA	HDD	160-250	1-2 GB	4 (3-Cell)	9 (6,9-Cell)	?	1.3 MP	Touchpad 2-buttons below	Linux not avail	XP or 7 Starter	Toshiba NB200 Series User's Manual
VIA
VIA	Nanobook	0.85	1.87	7.0	800×480 WVGA Touchscreen	133	C7-M	1.2		?	DVI-I	HDD	30	1	?	?	?	?		Linux	XP, Vista	
VIA	Openbook (reference design, not product)	1.00	2.20	8.9	1024×600; WSVGA	133	C7-M ULV	1.6		?	VGA	HDD	80	2	?	?	?	?		Linux	XP, Vista	
Zelybron	Micro Nina	1.27	2.79	10.2	1280×600; WXGA glossy	147	C7-M	1.6		?	?	HDD	120	1 – 4	2 (3-cell)	4 (6-cell)	92%		Touchpad 2-buttons below.	ZelybronBSD		

== See also ==
- Comparison of netbook-oriented Linux distributions
- Comparison of tablet computers
- Ultra-mobile PC (UMPC)
- Linux-based devices
- Netbook, Ultrabook, Chromebook, SubNotebook, Laptop, Portable computer
