= Samsung NC20 =

Netbook computer released in 2009

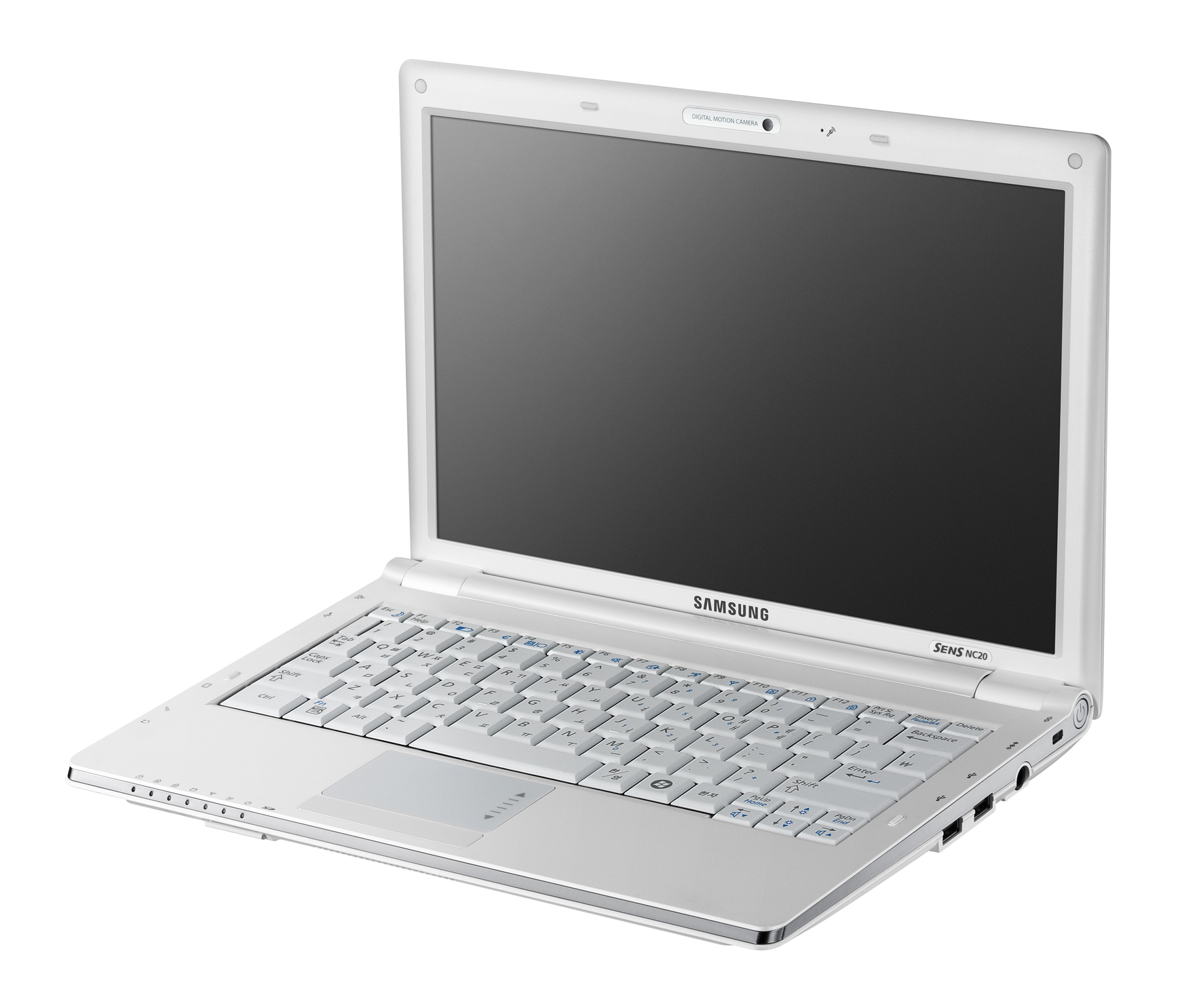
- Samsung NC20 side view with lid open
- Developer: Samsung
- Type: Subnotebook/Netbook
- Media: 160 GB 2.5" SATA HDD
- Operating system: Windows XP
- CPU: VIA Nano ULV Processor U2250 (1.3+ GHz, 800 MHz)
- Memory: 1 GB
- Display: 12.1" 1280 × 800 LED-backlit TFT LCD
- Input: Keyboard (100% full size, anti-bacterial); Touchpad; Microphone
- Camera: 1.3 megapixel webcam built-in
- Connectivity: 10/100 Mbit Ethernet; 802.11b/g wireless LAN; Bluetooth 2.0+EDR (standard configuration); 3 USB 2.0 ports 3-in-1 Flash Memory card reader (SD, SDHC, MMC)
- Power: 6.5 hours of battery life with standard 6-cell battery
- Dimensions: 292.4 mm × 217 mm × 30.7 mm
- Weight: 1.52 kg

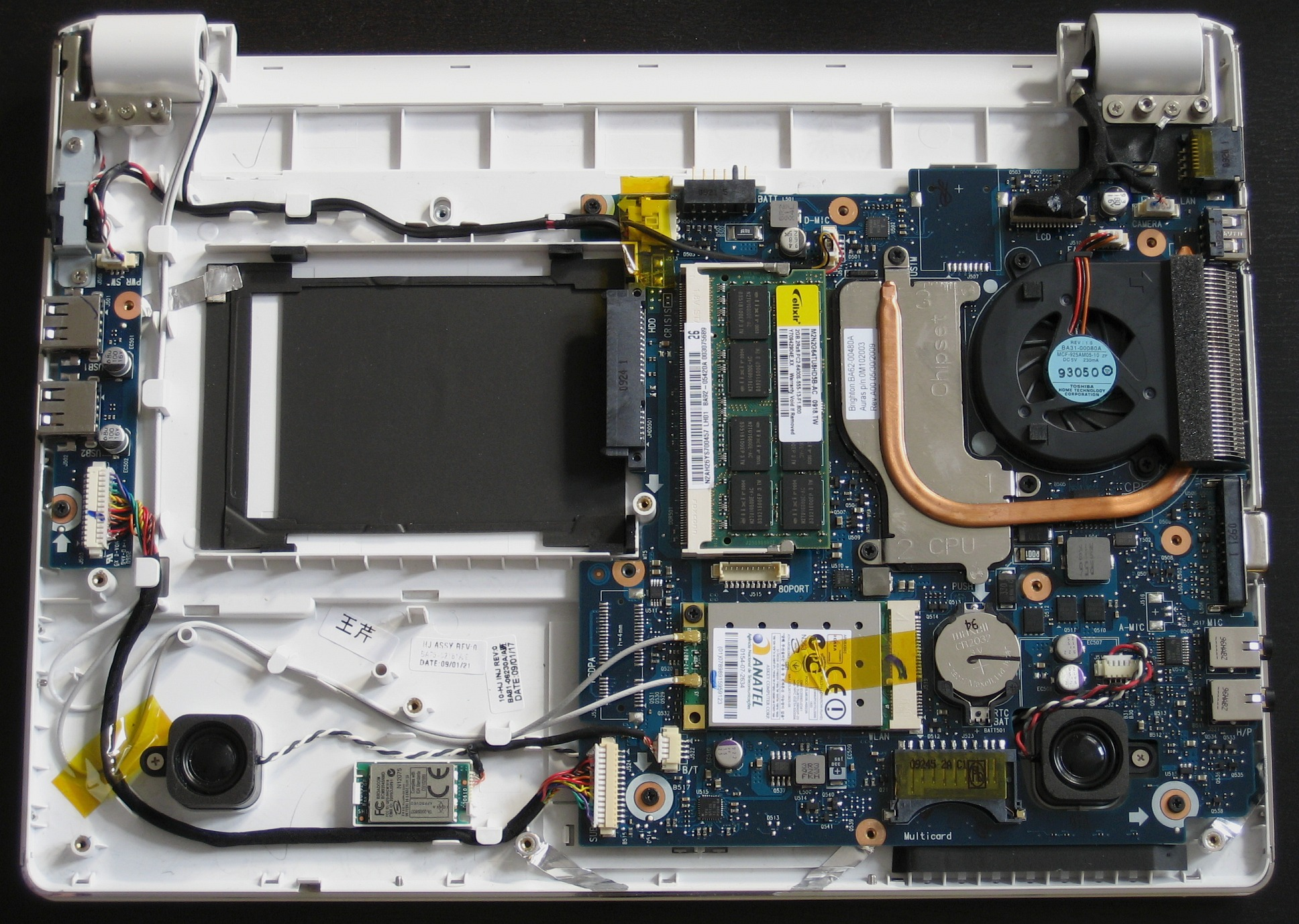
Samsung NC20 opened (harddrive and battery removed)

The Samsung NC20 is a subnotebook / Netbook computer designed by Samsung. At the time of its introduction, (February 2009, while in the U.S.A. was in March 2009), it was the first mainstream netbook to use the VIA Nano processor and the first to support the x86-64 instruction set. The 12.1" screen size is larger than typical for this class of ultra portable PC. Its most direct competitors are the Lenovo IdeaPad S12 and the MSI Wind U210.

== Technical overview ==
=== Processor and memory ===
The Samsung NC20 uses a VIA Nano ULV Processor U2250 (running from 800 MHz - 1,6 GHz) and comes with 1 GB RAM. Internally, the NC20 has one slot for RAM accepting memory modules up to 2 GB.

The hardware is powerful enough to run Windows 7 in everyday situations (web-browsing, email, office applications). However, CPU-demanding tasks (e.g. Flash videos) tend to put the system at its limit.

=== Display ===
The screen is a glossy display and measures 12.1 inches (307 mm) diagonally. It has a native resolution of 1280 × 800 pixels. The screen is LED-backlit. An external display can be used through the standard VGA connector.

=== Keyboard and touchpad ===
The 84-key keyboard is a full-size keyboard, with standard 18.5mm key pitch between keys. The keyboard has also been coated with anti-bacterial Silver Nano ions. The touchpad supports multi-touch gestures.

=== Storage ===
The standard internal hard drive is a SATA 160 GB. It also includes a SD card slot, supporting MMC, SD and SDHC cards for additional storage.

=== Connectivity ===
The NC20 has built-in LAN (10/100 MBit) via a standard-sized RJ45-jack, 802.11b/g Wi-Fi as well as Bluetooth. It also comes with 3 USB 2.0 ports.

=== Audio and video ===
A webcam (Namuga 1.3 megapixel) is built into the display frame, as well as a microphone. Together with the built-in stereo speakers, the NC20 can be used for audio/video conferences (e.g. using Skype), albeit only with moderate call-quality. The webcam picture becomes relatively noisy under low-light conditions and the microphone produces audible noise and picks up vibrations from the harddisk or when typing.

The NC20 also has standard 3.5mm jacks for audio output (headphones / line-out) and input (external microphone / line-in), allowing for far better audio quality than the built-in speakers and microphone.

== Criticism ==
Not all of the features of this notebook are supported under Linux. Playing video and microphone are partially supported. External monitor support under Linux is not possible. WLAN under Ubuntu is reported to have frequent freezeups.

== See also ==
- Samsung NC10
- Comparison of netbooks
