= NC10 =

NC10, NC-10, or similar, may refer to:

- North Carolina's 10th congressional district
- North Carolina Highway 10
- Samsung NC10
- NC10 phylum, a bacterial phylum
