= T91 =

T91 may refer to:

- Asus Eee T91, a netbook computer
- INS Tarmugli (T91), a patrol vessel of the Indian Navy
- T91 assault rifle
