= A120 =

A120, A.120 or A-120 may refer to:

- A120 road (England), a road connecting Puckeridge and Harwich
- A120 road (Malaysia), a road in Perak
- Ansaldo A.120, a 1925 Italian reconnaissance aircraft
- HMAS Launceston (J179/B246/A120), a 1941 Royal Australian Navy Bathurst class corvette
- One A120, a netbook computer
- A-120, an entity that originates from the Roblox game "Doors"
