= Zelybron Micro Nina =

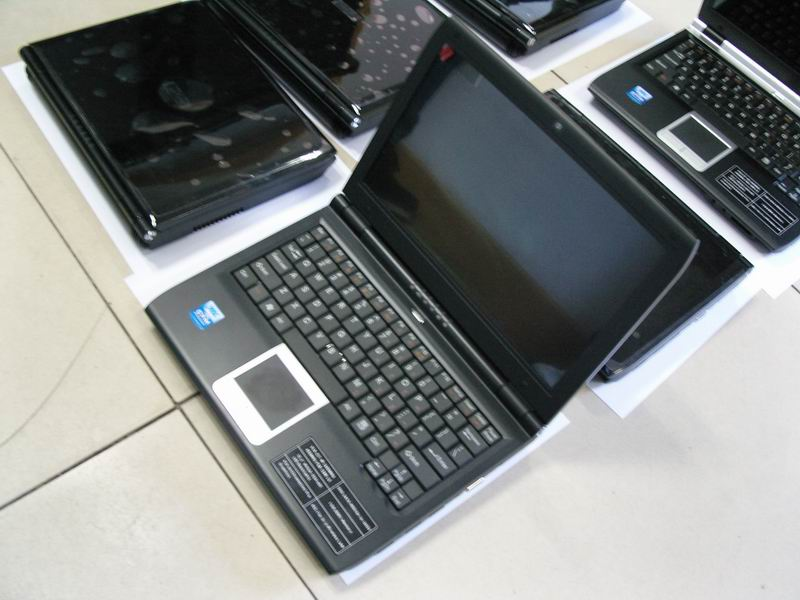
- Manufacturer: Zelybron B.V.
- Type: Subnotebook / Netbook
- Released: November 2008
- Media: 120 GB Hard disk drive
- Operating system: ZelybronBSD / Windows XP / Windows Vista
- CPU: VIA C7-M (1.6 GHz)
- Memory: 1 - 4 GB DDR2 RAM
- Display: 259 mm (10.2" inch) diagonal Wide XGA LCD, VIA/S3 UniChrome Pro IGP
- Input: Keyboard; Touchpad
- Camera: VGA 1.3 Megapixel
- Connectivity: Wi-Fi IEEE 802.11a/b/g Ethernet 10/100 Mbit/s; USB 2.0
- Power: 3-cell 2100 mAh or 6-cell 4400 mAh; Lithium-ion battery

The Zelybron Micro Nina is Zelybron's entrant to the Ultra-Mobile PC (UMPC) market and is aimed to provide a bridge between regular laptops and netbooks. The Micro Nina also is Zelybron's first OEM product.

Zelybron's Micro Nina is focussed towards business use and was introduced in November 2008 in Europe, it is available with Microsoft Windows or Zelybron's own FreeBSD variant pre-installed. But has at least since 12 June 2009 ended shipping of ZelybronBSD.

The Zelybron Micro Nina was originally designed to become a low-budget PC; its design was moved into a netbook-formatted device for professional use, the laptop compares to a regular PC in performance and capabilities. In the same line of production, Zelybron also released a low-budget PC, thin client and server, all of which are currently only available in Belgium, The Netherlands and Germany, however, Zelybron has announced the opening of a new factory in Shenzhen, China and is planning for global distribution of its whole Nina series.

== Features ==
Zelybron created a netbook sized computer which compares to regular PCs. Zelybron was the first to create a laptop capable of doing regular day-to-day work with the mobility of a netbook and the capacity of a full PC.

Zelybron aimed to add all features to its Micro Nina line a daily laptop user would expect from his/her laptop. It comes with a nearly normal size keyboard for easier use, surround-sound audio, a 1.3 Megapixel Webcam, 2 USB ports, card reader, a VGA connector for connecting an external monitor and has an internal SATA controller for either connecting a hard drive or a solid-state drive.

The Micro Nina has very low power consumption (15 W) and compares with power use and mobility to other UMPCs.

The Micro Nina is installed with either Windows XP or Windows Vista, but can optionally be configured with ZelybronBSD which provides a simplified interface comparable with the Asus Eee PC Xandros.

== Availability ==
Zelybron currently only sells the laptops directly to customers and has recently moved into a new office in Breda, The Netherlands; the laptops seem not to be available from other distribution channels as of this writing.

Zelybron currently is distributing its laptops worldwide by themselves; With the opening of a new factory in Shenzhen, China, Zelybron hopes to bring its full range of products to more people and gain more recognition around the world. With the opening of its new factory, Zelybron also tries to create an extra, self-controlled, distribution channel, as stated by a local newspaper in Breda.

== Other 'Ninas' ==
The Zelybron Micro Nina netbooks are also available in 178 mm (7"), 203 mm (8") and 229 mm (9") format on request, however, Zelybron does not actively market these, next to this, Zelybron also allows customizations of its products on a per product basis since February 2009, allowing customers to personalize their products in colouring and configuration.

== See also ==
- Comparison of netbooks
