= MSI Wind Netbook =

Family of netbooks by Micro-Star International

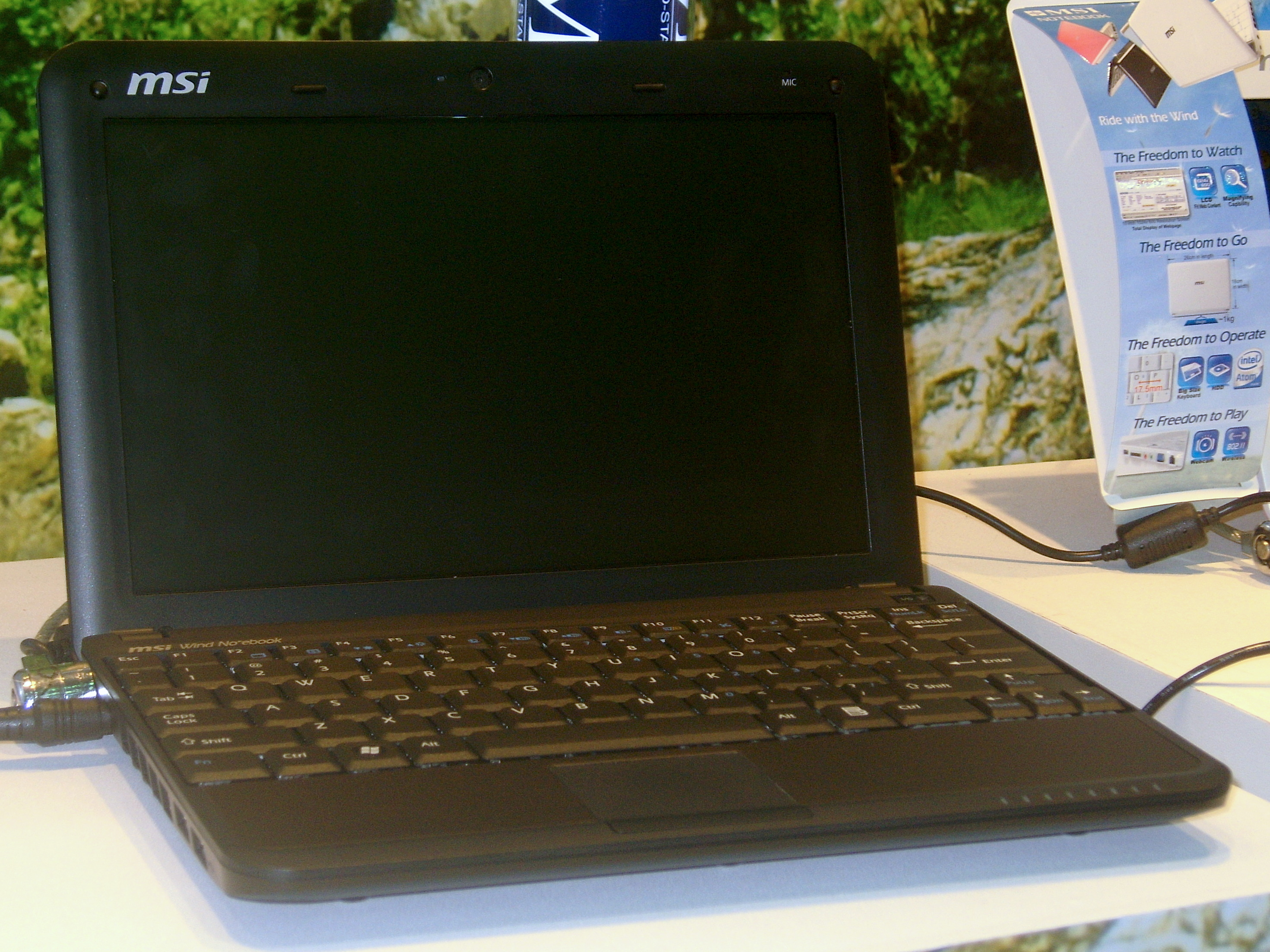
- An image of a 2008 Computex MSI Wind Notebook
- Developer: Micro-Star International
- Type: Subnotebook/Netbook
- Media: 80, 120, 160 or 250 GB 2.5" HDD
- Operating system: Windows 7 Starter, Windows XP, Linux
- CPU: Intel Atom @ 1.60 / 1.66 GHz (N270, N280, N450)
- Memory: 1 GB (Linux) or 1 GB / 2 GB (Windows)
- Display: 10" (25.4 cm) 1024 x 600 LED-backlit TFT LCD
- Input: Keyboard; Touchpad; Microphone; 1.3 Megapixel Webcam
- Connectivity: 10/100 Mbit Ethernet; 802.11b/g/n wireless LAN; 3 USB 2.0 ports 4-in-1 Flash Memory card reader Bluetooth (only Windows version, not Aldi Medion version)
- Power: 6-cell (5.5 hours) or 3-cell (2.5 hours)
- Dimensions: 25.98 × 18.0 × 3.40 cm
- Weight: 1.0 kg (3-cell battery) or 1.2 kg (6-cell)

The MSI Wind Netbook was a family of subnotebooks / netbooks designed by Micro-Star International (MSI). Wind stands for "Wi-Fi Network Device". The first model was announced at CeBIT 2008, and first listed for pre-orders on May 9, 2008. While initially 8.9- and 10.1-inch screen versions existed, as of 2010 only the 10.1" remained, with a resolution of 1024 × 600. While most models had 1 GB of RAM, some had 2 GB, and hard disks ranged from 80 GB on the oldest to 250 GB on the newest models. Also featured were Bluetooth, WLAN and a 1.3 megapixel camera. The Wind PC was MSI's response to the successful Asus Eee PC. The keyboard was 92% of full-size.

It was available in 10-inch and 7-inch Wind Pad tablets using the Android operating system.

== OEM versions ==
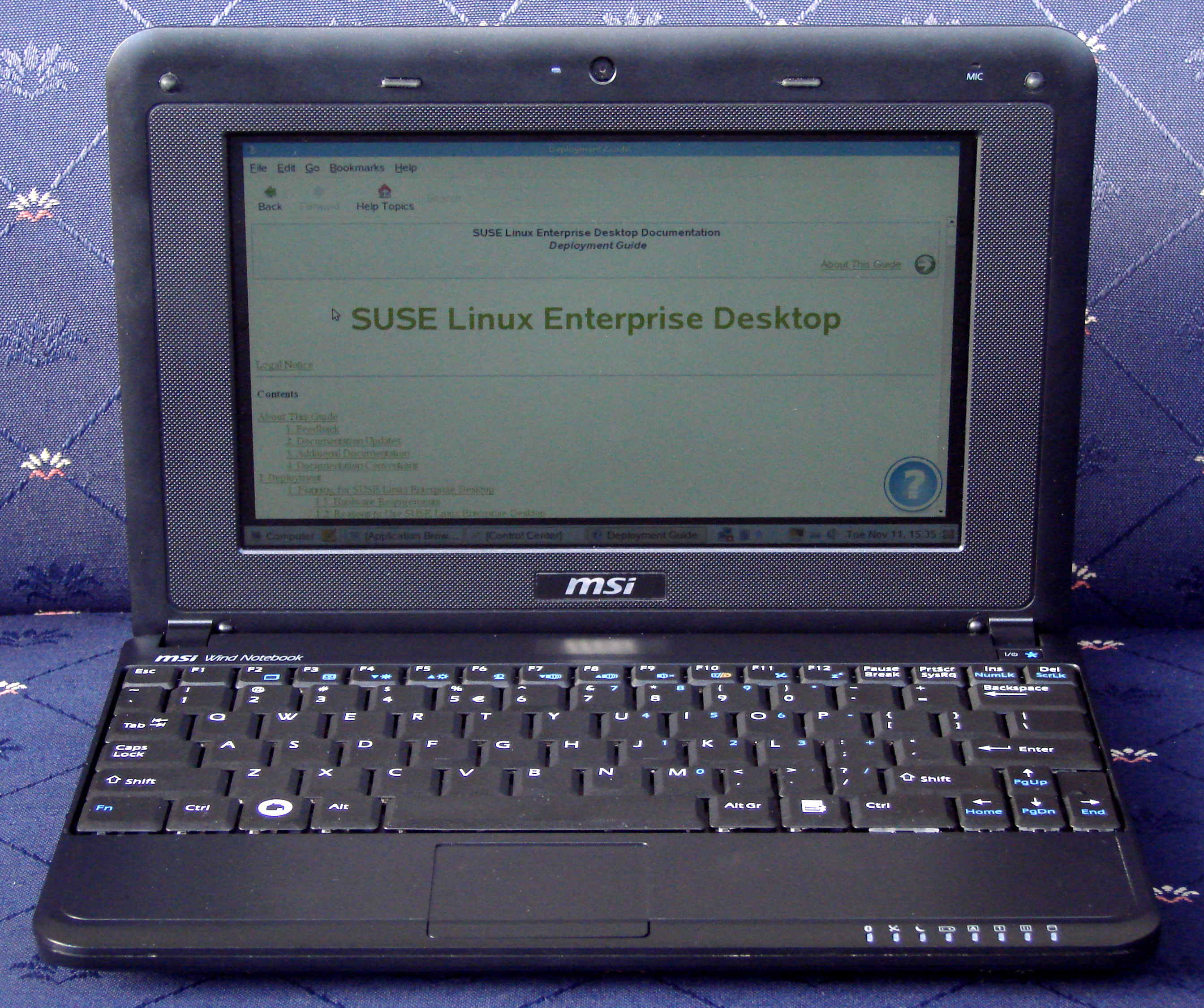
MSI Wind Netbook U90x

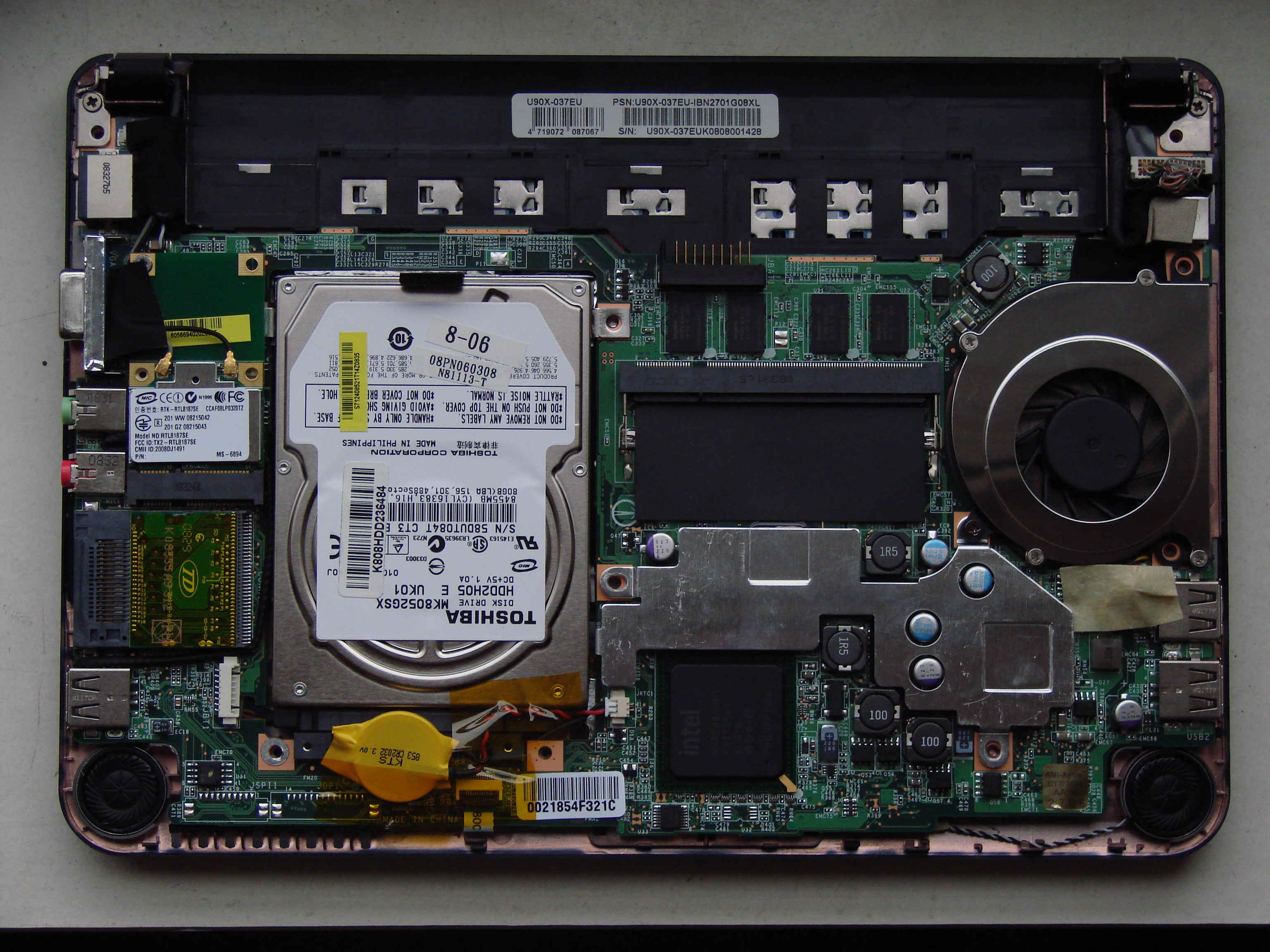
MSI Wind Netbook U90x internals

When the original Wind U100 was released, many original equipment manufacturer versions of the Wind were also released, under different names.

- Advent 4211, 4222 as an in-store brand for PC City, PC World and other Dixons Stores Group retailers in Europe and the UK.
- Ahtec LUG N011 in the Netherlands, Spain and Belgium. Offered with SUSE Linux, Windows XP or no operating system. Had the same design as the original Wind (white). It came without logo on the case.
- Averatec Buddy
- First model of Axioo Pico in Indonesia with a 160 GB HDD, versions with and without Bluetooth.
- Certified Data U100 in Canada, sold at London Drugs.
- LG X110, marketed in Argentina, Brazil (modelos x110-1010 and 1000) and Sweden
- Hannspree HANNSnote with a 6-cell battery and a 160 GB HDD
- Medion Akoya Mini in Germany, Switzerland, Austria, the Netherlands, Belgium, Denmark, Spain, France, the United Kingdom, Ireland, Poland and Australia (as of 23 October 2008) (the Medion Akoya Mini is slightly different, containing a different wireless card, no Bluetooth (Aust. model features mini Bluetooth dongle), and 0.3 Mpx camera).
- Mivvy M310 in the Czech Republic. but with 2 GB of RAM and a 120 GB HDD.
- Mouse Computer LuvBook U100 in Japan.
- Multirama HT Xpress Book in Greece with 160 GB HDD
- NTT Corrino 101I and Aristo Pico i300 in Poland
- Positivo Mobo White in Brazil, with 4 models: 1000, 1050, 1070 and 1090. All sport Intel Atom Processors and range from 512 MB RAM / 80 GB HDD (Mobo White 1000) to 1 GB RAM and 160 GB HDD (Mobo White 1090).
- Proline U100 in South Africa.
- ProLink Glee TA-009 in Singapore with touchpad buttons positioned by the side and optional 3G HSDPA connectivity.
- RoverBook Neo U100 in Russia with 120 GB or 160 GB HDD
- Terra 10G in Europe with various option
- Tsunami Moover T10 in Portugal (XP version only)

Some OEM versions were offered in different colors to the original MSI Wind, apart from the Tsunami Moover (white only), the Mobo White and the Ahtec LUG N011 (white only).

== Specifications ==
	Linux version	Windows XP version / Advent 4211	Medion Akoya Mini	Windows 7 version
Operating system	Novell Linux (SUSE)	Microsoft Windows XP Home Edition		Windows 7
Memory (Note: 2 GB maximum memory)	1 GB DDR2/667 MHz (onboard)		1 GB DDR2/667 MHz (SODIMM)	1 GB DDR2/667 MHz (onboard)
WLAN	802.11 b/g		802.11 n	
Webcam	1.3 megapixels		0.3 megapixels	1.3 megapixels
Bluetooth	No	Yes	No (Some regions include free USB module.)	Yes
Chipset	Intel 945GSE, ICH7-M			
Display	8.9"W or 10.1"W (1024×600) LCD with LED backlighting			10.1"
VGA	GMA 950			
Hard drive	Western Digital Scorpio 80 GB,120 GB or 160 GB / 2.5" SATA / 5400 RPM			
Battery	3-cell, 2200 mAh: 2.5 hours or 6-cell, 5200 mA·h: 5.5 hours (in some areas 4400 mA·h)			
USB	2 USB 1.0, 1 USB 2.0 ports			
Ethernet	10/100BT ports			
Audio interface	3.5 mm jack input/Output connectors			
Card reader	4-in-1 card reader– SD/SDHC, MMC, MS, MS Pro			
Dimension	260 x 180 x 19–34 mm (10.23" x 7.08" x 0.748"/1.34") 38 mm (1.496") thick w/feet			
Weight	2.3 lb (1.04 kg) for 3-cell, 2.6 lb (1.18 kg) for 6-cell			
Touchpad	2.0 x 1.7 inch (Initial batches had a Synaptics touchpad with gestures, though later batches have a Sentelic touchpad with less widespread driver support.)			

== Customization ==
The MSI Wind netbooks (specifically the MSI Wind U100) were subject to a lot of enthusiast customization; especially as Hackintoshes. Though many other netbooks could run Mac OS X, the MSI Wind was one of the most popular mainly because of its ideally large keyboard, simple design, and wide availability of options. The MSI Wind (specifically the U100) could be installed with Mac OS X Snow Leopard 10.6.8 with a modified bootloader and kernel. Installing ChromeOS and turning it into a Chromebook is also a common customization.

== See also ==
- Comparison of netbooks
