= Tianhua GX-1C =

2006 Linux netbook computer

- Manufacturer: Sinomanic
- Type: Subnotebook
- Media: hard disk IDE 40GB
- Operating system: Linux, Future Alpha
- CPU: Loongson 1 (Longxin)
- Memory: SDRAM 128 MB MCom
- Display: LCD 8.4 in diagonal, 1280x1024, 24-bit color
- Input: Keyboard
- Connectivity: Ethernet 10/100M, DSL modem

The Sinomanic Tianhua GX-1C is a specially tailored subnotebook for primary and secondary school students in the People's Republic of China. It uses the Loongson I (Longxin) CPU. The device is designed for use as an educational aid and to introduce young students to computers.

== History ==
Sichuan-based Sinomanic Co., Ltd., launched four models of low-cost personal computers in 2006. Sinomanic is the second maker of Loongson-based personal computers in mainland China. The firm has announced a sales target of 500,000 to 1 million units for their Tianhua GX-1C model. The GX-1C uses a Loongson I (Longxin) CPU similar to that used in the commercially distributed Longmeng Municator from a Chinese startup named Yellow Sheep River. Loongson (Longxin) translates as "Dragon Chip".

Sinomanic has created four different models for distribution to specific markets. The Tianhua GX-1 and Tianhua GX-1C are marketed for education. The Tian Yan GX-2 is a rural computer marketed for farmers, Tian Yan is designed to be used with a television instead of a standard computer monitor, much like the Commodore 64 and Amiga. the operating system for the Tian Yan is tailored for use with a television display. The Tianlong GX-3 is a more robust machine marketed for business. The Tiansheng GX-4 with slightly less memory and processor speeds that vary between 400 MHz and 600 MHz marketed for multimedia users. All desktop units support VGA and television video output.

== Sinomanic model comparison table ==
Prices of desktop models do not include displays.

Model	Name	Price	CPU	Memory	Storage	Market
GX-1C	Tianhua	¥1,998	400 MHz	128 MB SDRAM	40 GB	education
GX-1	Tianhua	¥1,998	400 MHz	128 MB DDR	60 GB	education
GX-2	Tian Yan	¥988	400 MHz	128 MB DDR	1 GB SD	rural
GX-3	Tianlong	¥2,998*	600 MHz	256 MB DDR	60 GB	business
GX-4	Tiansheng	¥1,398*	400 MHz	128 MB DDR	60 GB	multimedia

== Technology ==
=== Hardware GX-1C ===
The reference hardware specifications as of 28 October 2006 are:

- CPU: Loongson 1 (Godson) 32 KB cache level RISC instruction set 32-bit CPU – GS32I
- Clock speed: 400 MHz
- Display: LCD 8.4 inch 1280 x 1024–24 (TFT 24-bit color) Xiancun
- SDRAM: 128 MB PC100 MCom
- Hard disk: IDE notebook 40 GB
- IDE controller: 32-bit PCI IT8212, two IDE channels, supports four IDE devices
- RAID controller: supports PIO Mode 0–4, DMA mode 0–2, Ultra DMA Mode 0–6, embedded CPU RAID function
- Ethernet: 10/100M
- Modem port: ADSL
- Host interface: integrated USB 1.1
- Audio: AC'97 2.2 18 48 kHz (maximum sampling frequency which supports voice communication); stereo 2-channel, jacks for external stereo speakers and microphones, line-out, and mic-in
- Speakers: stereo built in
- Keyboard: integrated
- Power source: unspecified notebook power supply

=== Software ===
According to a translated FAQ on the Sinomanic website and an article on Sanhaostreet.com, Sinomanic technicians were having trouble getting Loongson's proprietary RISC instruction sets to work with Debian Linux and Windows CE. However, the use of the MIPS architecture allowed them to correct many of their compatibility issues.

Versions of Debian Linux and Windows CE will be available for the units that ship initially. But because these operating systems cannot be optimized for Loongson's unique RISC instruction set, Sinomanic has continued development on their own second-generation microkernel operating system codenamed Future Alpha. Future Alpha has apparently been customized for compatibility with the 32-bit Loongson I (Longxin) processor. And Sinomanic recently tested an updated version of Future Alpha, for the 64-bit Loongson II microprocessor. The company said that the 64-bit version of their Future Alpha operating system had successfully passed testing on January 19, 2007.

In a press release dated 3 March 2007, Sinomanic demonstrated a custom version of Debian Linux running on the Tian Yan GX-2 their rural computer. The unit appeared to be using GNOME as its graphical user interface. Software applications shown were: the Mozilla Firefox browser, an unnamed text editor, Pidgin instant messenger, a PDF reader, and the Evolution email client.

== See also ==
- Comparison of netbooks a comparison including similar models
- One Laptop per Child, OLPC
- Digital Textbook a South Korean Project that intends to distribute tablet notebooks to elementary school students.
- Lemote also called Dragon Dream is a low-cost computer designed and made in China
- VIA OpenBook, a project functionally similar to the OLPC
- Simputer is an earlier project to construct cheap handheld computers in India
- VIA pc-1 Initiative a project of VIA Technologies to help bridge the digital divide.
- Edubuntu: A free Linux distribution designed specifically for use in schools and home classrooms
