= Samsung NC10 =

2008 netbook computer

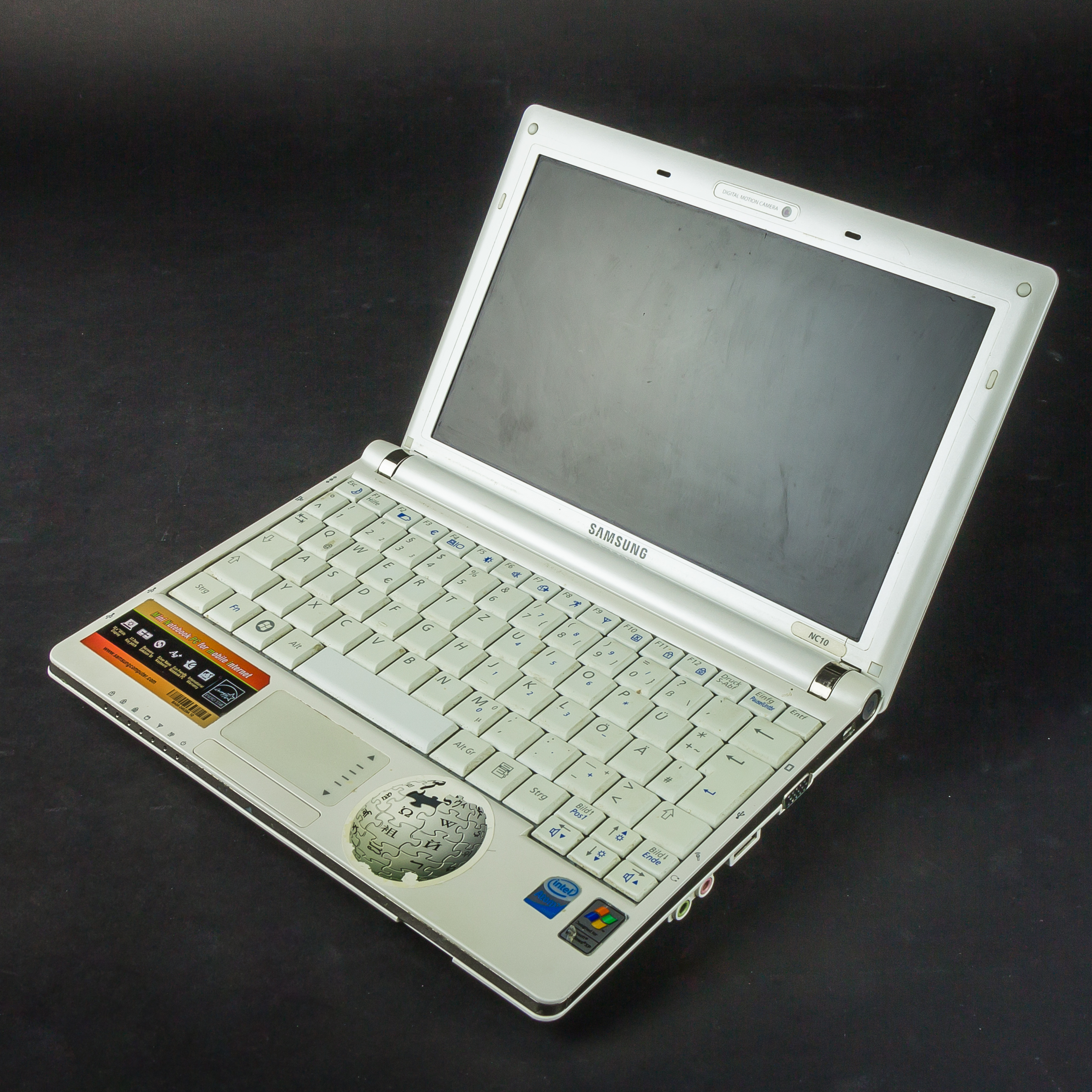
- An NC10
- Developer: Samsung
- Type: Subnotebook/Netbook
- Media: 160 GB 2.5″ SATA HDD
- Operating system: Windows XP
- CPU: 1.6 GHz Intel Atom N270 (32-bit)
- Memory: 1 GB (Maximum 2 GB)
- Display: 10.2″ (25.9 cm) 1024×600 LED-backlit TFT LCD
- Input: Keyboard (93% full size, anti-bacterial); Touchpad; Microphone
- Camera: 1.3 megapixel Webcam built-in
- Connectivity: 10/100 Mbit Ethernet; 802.11b/g wireless LAN; Bluetooth 2.0+EDR (standard configuration); 3 USB 2.0 ports 3-in-1 Flash Memory card reader (SD, SDHC, MMC)
- Power: 7.5 hours of battery life with standard 6-cell battery
- Dimensions: 26.1 × 18.5 × 3.0 cm
- Weight: 1.33 kg (2.8 lb) (including battery)

The Samsung NC10 (Samsung SENS NC10 in South Korea) is a subnotebook/netbook computer designed by Samsung. At the time of its introduction (2008), it was noted for its combination of a 10.2" screen and large 6-cell battery as standard, giving a battery life of up to 7.5 hours, a large hard disk drive and a release price of 499 USD (299 GBP).

== Technical overview ==
=== Processor and memory ===
The Samsung NC10 uses a 1.6 GHz Intel Atom N270 processor running at an FSB frequency of 533 MHz, and includes 1 GB of DDR2 800/6400 memory as standard. The laptop's graphics solution is the Intel GMA950 ( Intel 82945GME ). North bridge chipset is Intel 945GSE and south bridge is Intel ICH7-M. NC10 may be equipped with DDR2 667 or 800MHz, but 945GSE GMCH supports DDR2 400/533 MHz only, so there is no reason to install memory faster than 533 MHz (PC2-4200). Internally, the NC10 has one slot for memory accepting memory modules up to 2GB.

=== Display ===
The screen is a matte display and measures 10.2 inches (259 mm) diagonally, and has a resolution of 1024×600 pixels. An external display can be used through the standard VGA connector.

=== Keyboard ===
The 83-key keyboard is 93% of the size of a full-size keyboard, with 17.7 mm pitch between keys and 2 mm travel on each key press, with some reviews claiming it is the best keyboard of any netbook yet released. The keyboard has also been treated with the anti-bacterial Silver Nano technology.

=== Storage ===
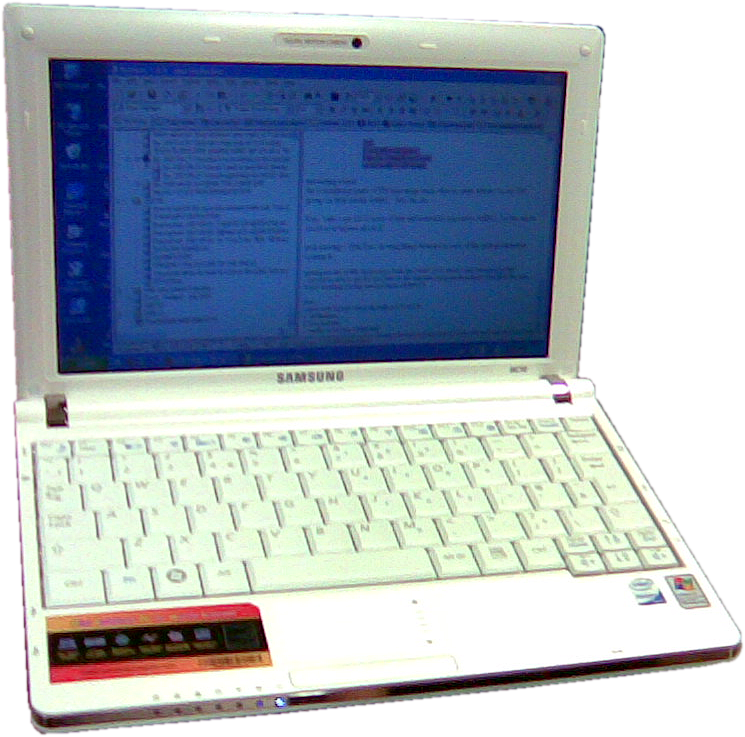
Samsung N 10

The standard internal hard drive size is 160 GB on a SATA 1.5 Gbit/s interface. It also includes an SD card slot, supporting MMC, SD and SDHC cards for additional storage. The standard internal hard drive can be replaced with a Solid State Drive (SSD).

== Operating systems ==
=== Windows platform ===
The NC10 was shipped with Windows XP Home Edition and can be upgraded to Windows Vista, Windows 7, Windows 8.1, or Windows 10. As the Intel Atom N270 processor is 32-bit, Windows 10 is the latest version of Windows that can be installed, as Windows 11 onwards no longer support 32-bit processors.

=== Linux ===
Linux (e.g. Ubuntu Netbook Edition, Xubuntu, Lubuntu, or Debian) runs well with the stock 1GB of RAM.

=== "Hackintosh" platform ===
The NC10 can be used as the platform to run Mac OS X using the IDeneb installation method. This combination of installing Apple's operating system on non-Apple hardware is often referred to as a "hackintosh" computer. In many cases, some features of either the hardware or software may not be totally functional or work as intended. There have been several such issues reported when using the NC10's default hardware.

=== Cloudready ===
The netbook can also be effectively turned into a "Chromebook" by installing the Cloudready operating system by Neverware. The newest version does work on the NC10, though the SIM slot is not functional.

== Colors and configurations ==
The NC10 is available in different colors and configurations. Colors include white, black, blue and pink. The configurations may differ in the lack of Bluetooth, e.g. in Spanish markets and some models in German markets, the fitting of a UMTS/HSDPA module, a weaker battery, or a stronger battery and a slightly bigger but non-multitouch touchpad as "special edition", available in the US.

=== Samsung NC110 ===
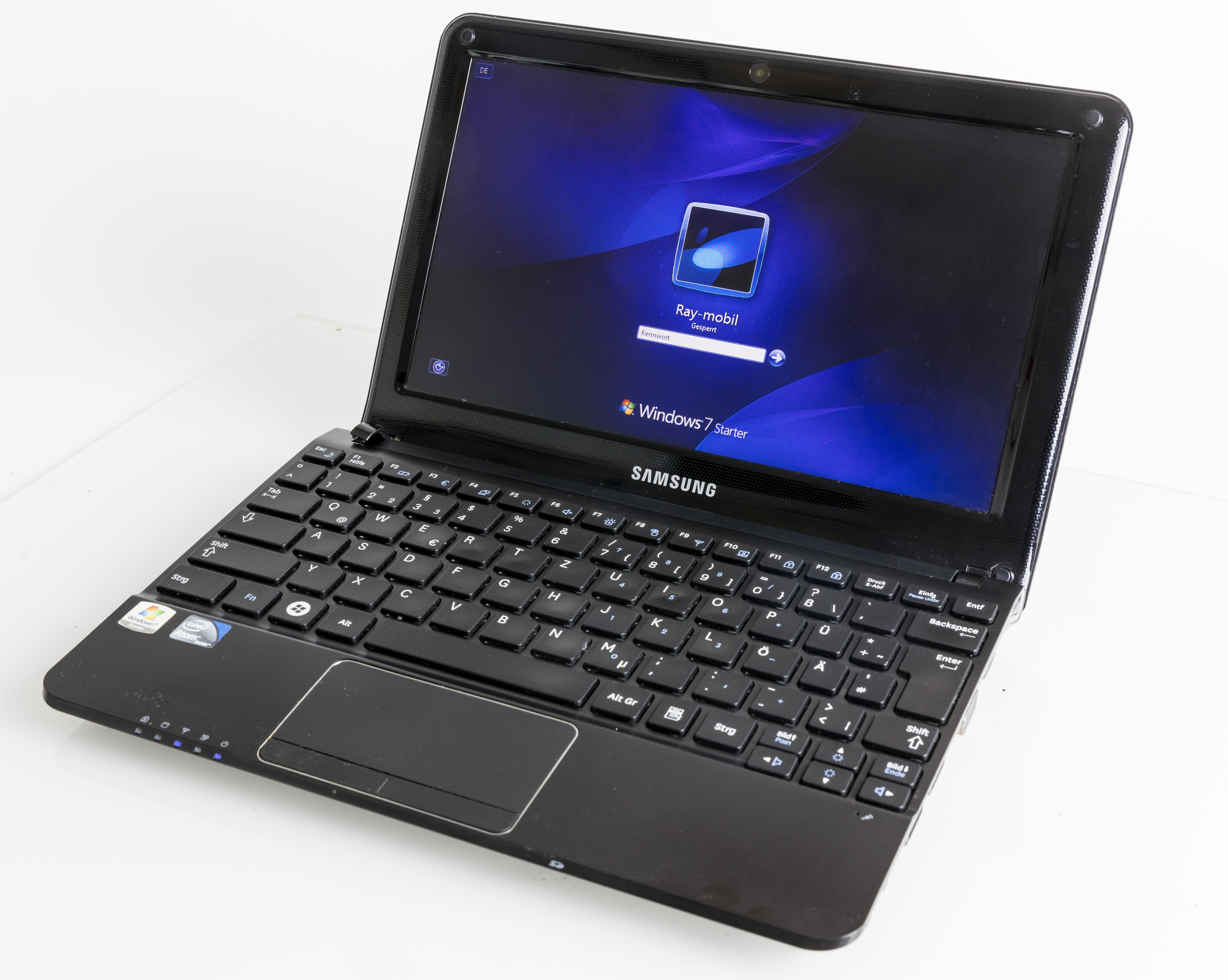
Model NC110

The new model N110 is an upgrade of the basic NC10 design, with improved battery life, modified touchpad and improved styling.

== See also ==
- Comparison of netbooks
- The Persistence of Chaos, art piece featuring the computer model
