= Carapelli Computers =

Taiwanese electronics company

- Type: Private
- Industry: Information technology, computer hardware, wholesale distribution
- Founded: 1983
- Headquarters: Dubai, United Arab Emirates (operations); Taiwan (founding)
- Products: Laptop computers, computer components, GPS devices, media products
- Brands: Impulse
- Number of employees: 2,000+ (manufacturing division)

Carapelli Computers (also known as Carapelli Ltd.) was a Taiwanese information technology company founded in 1983. The company operated as a distributor and manufacturer of computer hardware, linking Southeast Asian manufacturers to international markets. The company later established its primary distribution operations in Dubai, United Arab Emirates.

== History ==
=== Early years and expansion (1983–1997) ===
Carapelli was founded in Taiwan in 1983 as a trading company connecting Southeast Asian manufacturers to global markets. By 1986, the company was exporting computer components - including casings, power supplies, motherboards, and peripherals - to Canada and India.

In 1987, Carapelli expanded into Hong Kong and Bangkok to broaden its reach in both general merchandise and computer products. By 1991, the company had begun exporting notebooks from various OEM manufacturers under its own Impulse brand to the Canadian market.

=== Operations in the United Arab Emirates (1994–2005) ===
In 1994, Carapelli opened import facilities in the United Arab Emirates, establishing Carapelli Computers in Dubai with both retail and wholesale operations. The company further expanded its UAE presence in 2001 and 2002, opening additional locations at the Jebel Ali Free Zone for regional distribution across the Middle East and Africa, and in Abu Dhabi for domestic retail and wholesale.

In the year 2001, Carapelli again expanded its operations by establishing a large retail and wholesale presence in the U.A.E.'s trade capital Dubai and subsequently in the year 2002 Carapelli created two more branch locations at the Jebel Ali freezone port and in Abu Dhabi, the capital of the United Arab Emirates. The former was created to increase Carapelli's distribution abilities to the whole of the Middle East and Africa, and the latter was established in order to gain a larger retail and wholesale presence within the capital of the nation.

=== Manufacturing and the Impulse brand (2006–2008) ===
In 2006, Carapelli invested in manufacturing facilities in mainland China, initially producing media products and GPS systems. By 2008, the company's factory in Dongguan, Guangdong, occupied approximately 90,000 square metres and employed over 2,000 workers, manufacturing laptop components from outer casings to printed circuit boards.

== Impulse NPX-9000 ==
In July 2008, Carapelli launched the Impulse NPX-9000, which attracted media attention as the self-described "world's cheapest laptop" at a wholesale price of US$129–130. The device featured a 7-inch LCD screen, a 400 MHz MIPS processor, 128 MB of RAM, and 1 GB of flash storage, and ran a customized version of Linux. The laptop included bundled office productivity software, a web browser, and multimedia applications, with optional Wi-Fi connectivity via a dongle.

The NPX-9000 was sold in bulk orders of 100 units through Alibaba.com. At the time of its launch, the cheapest commercially available subnotebook was the Asus Eee PC 700 series, priced between US$200 and US$400, while the OLPC XO laptop had been offered at US$188.
