= Skytone Alpha-400 =

Linux-based low-cost netbook introduced in 2008

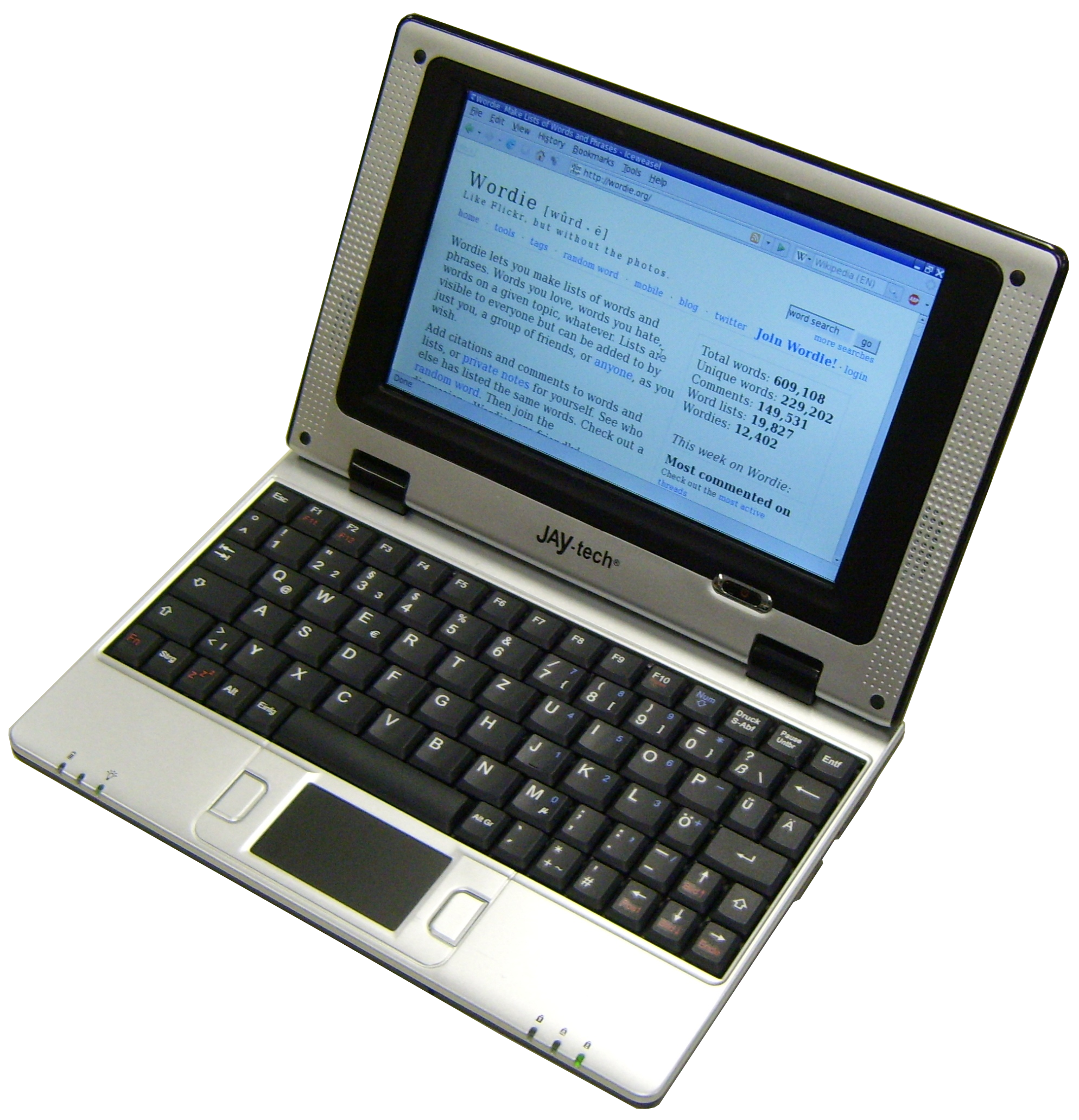
- German version branded by JAY-tech
- Developer: Guangzhou Skytone Transmission Technologies Co, Exon International Technology Co Ltd
- Manufacturer: Exon International Technology Co Ltd
- Type: Netbook
- Media: 1 or 2 GB NAND flash soldered on mainboard
- Operating system: customized CE Linux kernel 2.4.20 or Windows CE 5.0
- CPU: Ingenic Jz4730 a.k.a. XBurst (32-bit, 336 MHz)
- Memory: 128 MiB SDRAM
- Display: matte 7 in (18 cm) 800×480 LED-backlit TFT LCD
- Input: Keyboard, touchpad
- Connectivity: 10/100 Mbit Ethernet, ZyDAS ZD1211B 802.11b/g wireless LAN, 3 USB 1.1 ports, 3-in-1 flash memory card reader (SD, SDHC, MMC)
- Power: Li-ion 7.4 V, 2.1 Ah 2-cell battery, approximately 3–4 hours use
- Dimensions: 210 mm (8.3 in) H 140 mm (5.5 in) W 32 mm (1.3 in) D
- Weight: 0.65 kg (1.4 lb)

The Skytone Alpha-400 is a Linux-based low-cost netbook with a 7 in (18 cm) 800×480 LCD screen, introduced in 2008. Its measurements (length×width×depth) are 210 mm × 140 mm × 32 mm and it weighs 0.65 kg.

It was made in China by Guangzhou Skytone Transmission Technologies Co and Exon International Technology Co Ltd, with the former providing the Linux software and the latter producing the hardware. It uses a Chinese Ingenic Jz4730 336 MHz MIPSII-compatible one core 32-bit system-on-a-chip (SoC) with 128 MiB of SDRAM, and a 1–2 GB solid state drive.

The Skytone Alpha-400 was designed with low cost and child-friendliness in mind, with some versions being sold for as little as $130 retail. There is an option to swap the standard theme with a children's theme. It also comes with applications geared toward children, and a Flash player to play animated children's songs. The Flash player is not built into the browser, so Flash-dependent sites such as YouTube will not work, but a standalone Flash player is available to run .swf files and can be used to play Flash-based games.

== Alternative names ==
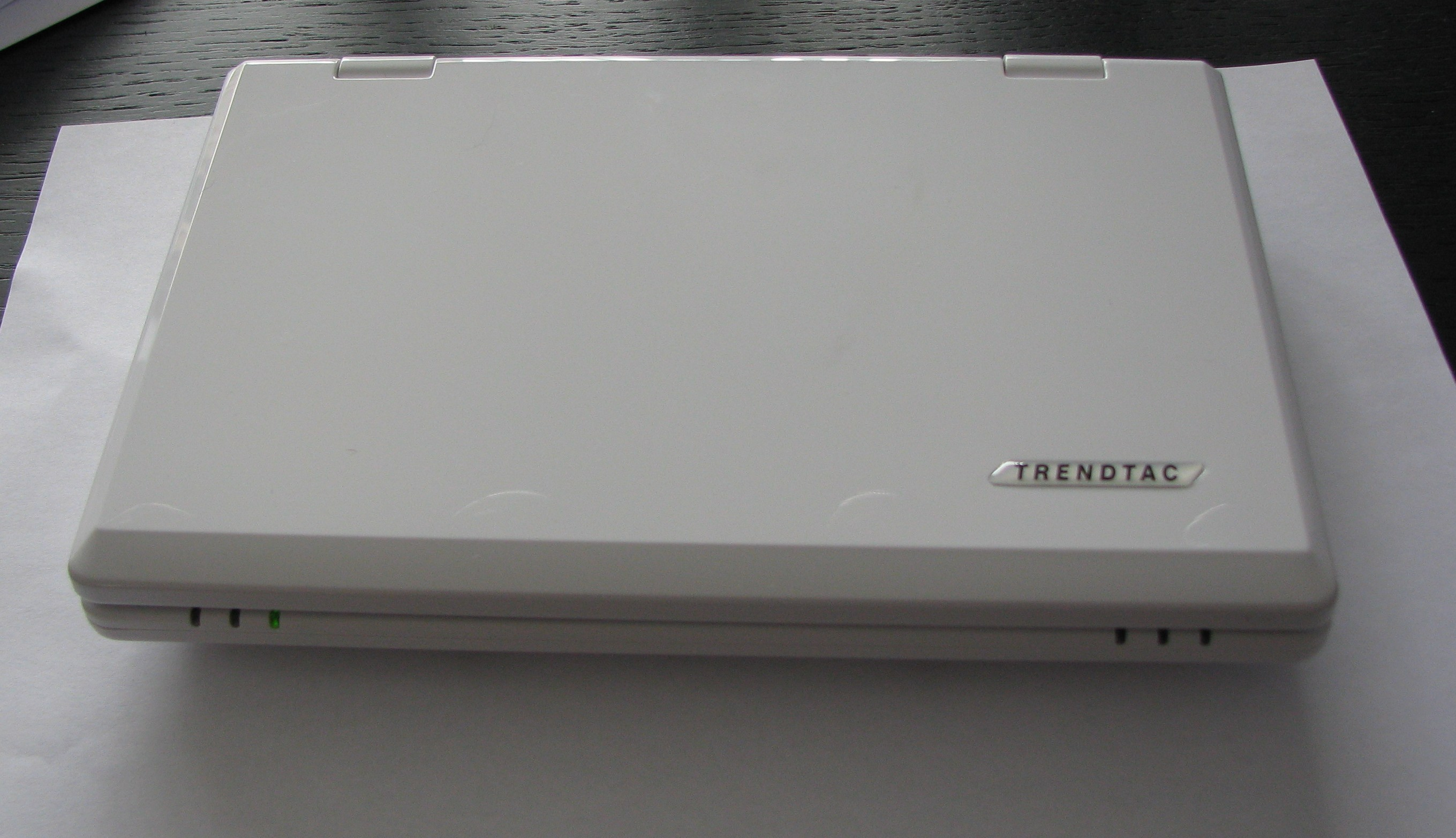
The Trendtac 700 EPC as sold in the Netherlands

The Skytone Alpha is often marketed, sometimes in slightly altered form, under many different brand names.

A non-exhaustive list of variants:

- 3k Razorbook 400 (also with Windows CE and more flash memory)
- Bestlink/Belco Alpha 400
- Belco 450R
- CherryPal Africa
- CnMBook
- CnM Lifestyle CnMbook
- Datacask Jupiter 0708l
- Elonex ONEt (ONEt+ with 2 GB NAND flash)
- Exon PC701-LX
- HiVision MiniNote/NB0700
- Impulse NPX-9000
- Impulse TNX-9500
- iPC400 — available in Greece
- IDA 400 — available in India
- JAY-tech Jee-PC 400S
- Letux 400 (uses Debian)
- Maplin miniBook
- Novatech Minibook
- PC701-LX
- Sakar MiniBook / PC-01017
- Semprotech T70AM04
- Semprotech T70DJ10
- Silverstar E-PC
- Skytone Alpha 400
- SurfOne INOS1
- Trendtac 700 EPC
- Yinlips Micro PC

== Features ==
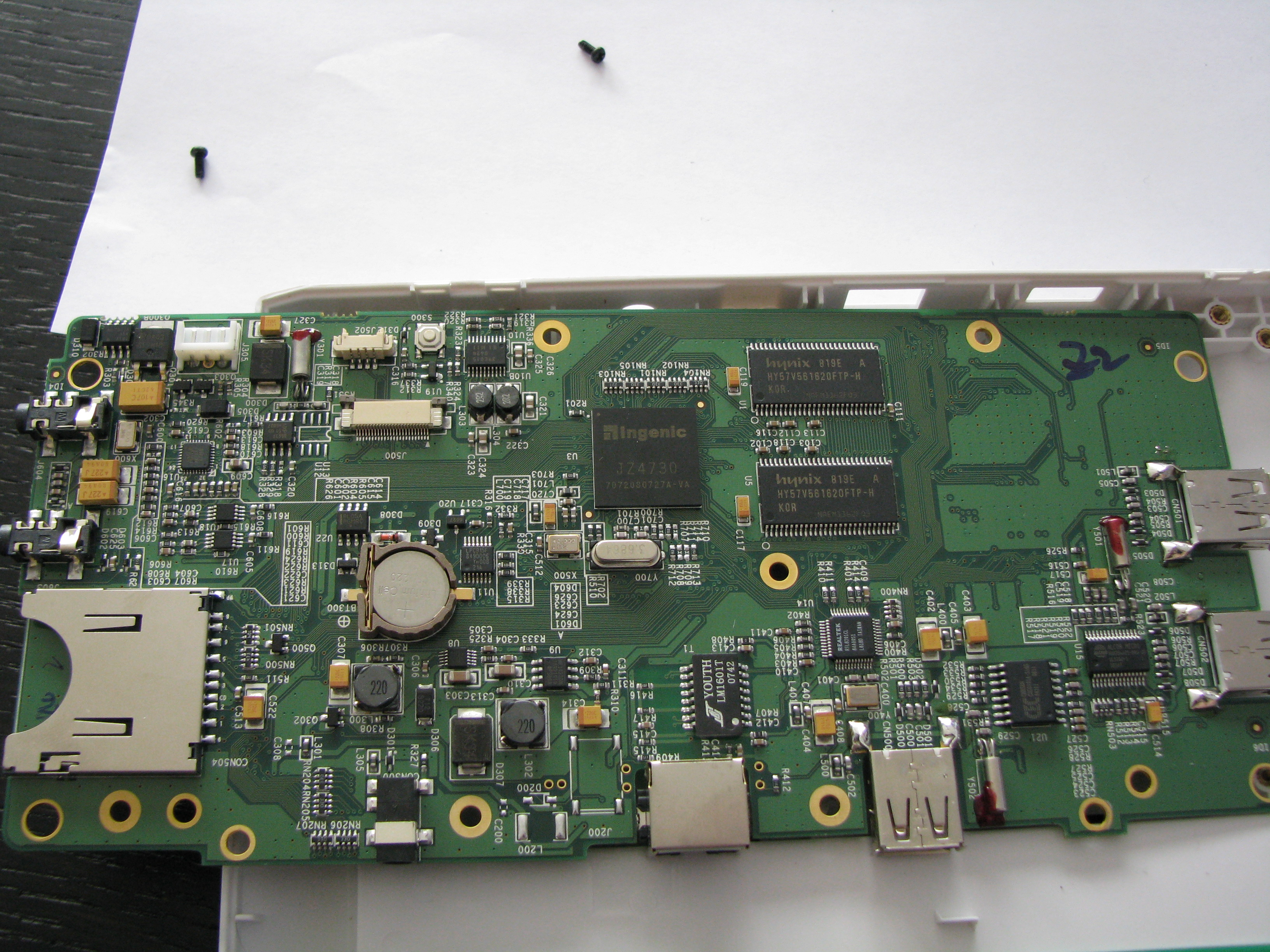
The motherboard of the device

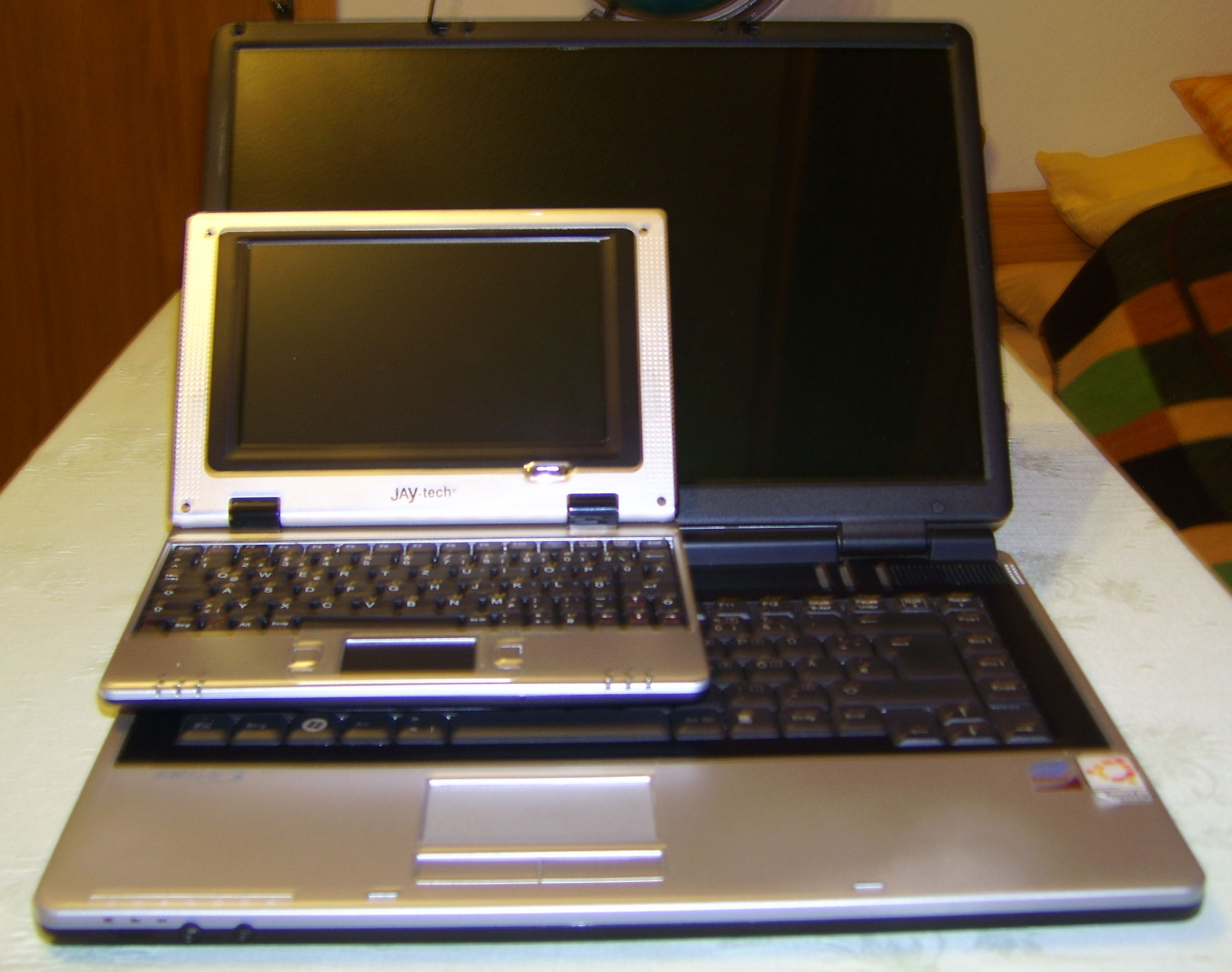
The Skytone Alpha 400 compared to a 15.4 in (39 cm) laptop

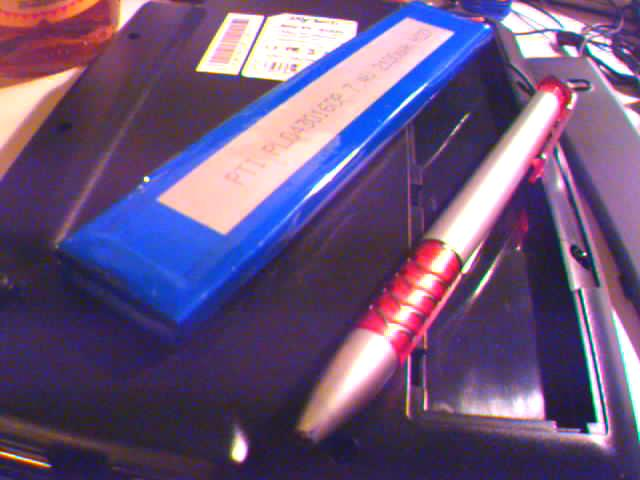
The 2.1 Ah battery compared to a pen

The Skytone Alpha-400 uses a customized version of Linux, based on a 2.4.x kernel, with a user-friendly interface optimized for children.

The Linux desktop is implemented as Kiosk software, meaning that nothing the user can do can modify the available applications, and no new applications can be (easily) added or removed.

Browsing can be done through the use of the built in browser called Bon Echo, an Alpha release of Mozilla Firefox 2, using the built-in 10/100 BASE-T Ethernet port, or the integrated 802.11 Wireless LAN, but the browser does not support Flash, meaning that Flash-intensive tools, such as YouTube, cannot be used. However, recently Exon, the original design manufacturer of most of these devices, announced full support for YouTube and most Flash enabled websites.

The device sports three USB ports, a small but fully functioning keyboard, a touchpad, stereo speakers, and a 2 cell 2.1 Ah battery.

The Skytone Alpha's processor uses as little as 0.2 W of power, and does not have a heat sink, and thus no ventilation openings. Some versions have extra features like a VGA video port, or a USB On-The-Go port.

== Available distributions ==
- The default OS, based on CELinux with the matchbox window manager and an Asus Eee PC inspired interface.
- Xenium This project seems to have been abandoned.
- 3MX based on the default OS, Xenium and Debian. Comes with the jwm window manager. Release 3.1 now available provides good functionality including wi-fi stumbler, aircrack-ng, a web server, and a good range of browser alternatives.
- Debian etch

So far, all distributions for this device use the 2.4.20-celf3 kernel. The kernel itself is not on the root file system itself, and gets loaded by u-boot.

== Other similar devices by Exon/Skytone ==
The successor of the device, the Alpha 400P, comes with a 416 MHz XScale, fifth generation ARM architecture, SoC (likely a Marvell PXA27x), USB 2.0 and up to 256 MiB of DDR2 memory. Another similar device comes with the 248 MHz ARM SoC AK7802Q216, 64/128 MiB of DDR SDRAM and Windows CE 5.0. Skytone announced another device called Alpha 680 running Android that features a 533 MHz Jade Tech Z228 ARM CPU. The Alpha-680 has a rotatable touchscreen that can be turned and flipped over, so that the unit becomes a tablet computer.

Another similar machine produced by Exon, but not sold by Skytone, comes with an x86 legacy compatible 800 MHz DM&P PDX-600 SoC CPU and is thus able to run Windows XP.

It uses a XGI Volari Z9s GPU without 3D acceleration. As it is usually sold with Windows XP pre-installed, its default configuration has 512 MiB DDR2 SDRAM and 4/8 GB flash. It is also available with a built-in 0.3 Mpixel camera. This version was first presented at CES 2009.

== Known issues ==
- The 3G support is limited to few USB 3G modems as a result of the old kernel. The same is true for the Wi-Fi module. The Ath5k driver used in the device for the ZD1211B module had been replaced since 2.6.18 for providing an unstable connection. As it is running 2.4.20, the old driver is still in use.
- While it is possible to install gnash in order to obtain Flash support, it has been reported that the processor is too slow, so that it can take near enough to ten minutes or more for something to load.
- The default distribution does not provide root access per default, but it is possible to install a root terminal through the software manager.

== See also ==
- Dingoo, a Chinese handheld game console based on the same Ingenic Xburst processor.
