= Lemote =

Chinese computer company

Jiangsu Lemote Tech Co., Ltd
- Type: Private
- Industry: Integrated circuit design, computer hardware, computer software
- Founded: June 2006; 20 years ago
- Headquarters: Changshu (Suzhou), Jiangsu, China
- Products: MIPS64 Loongson based motherboards, personal computers
- Website: www.lemote.com

Jiangsu Lemote Tech Co., Ltd or Lemote (Chinese: 航天龙梦; pinyin: háng tiān lóng mèng; lit. 'Aerospace Dragon Dream') is a computer company established as a joint venture between the Jiangsu Menglan Group and the Chinese Institute of Computing Technology, involved in computer hardware and software products, services, and projects.

== History ==
In June 2006, shortly after Institute of Computing Technology of the Chinese Academy of Sciences developed Loongson 2E they need a company to build end product, so the Jiangsu Menglan Group began a joint venture with the Institute of Computing Technology of the Chinese Academy of Sciences. The venture was named Jiangsu Lemote Tech Co., Ltd.

A computer was announced by Fuxin Zhang, an ICT researcher also a Lemote staff, who said the purpose of this project was to "provide everyone with a personal computer". The device is intended for low income groups and rural area students.

== Hardware ==
Lemote builds small form factor computers including network computers and netbooks with Loongson Processors.

=== Netbook computers ===
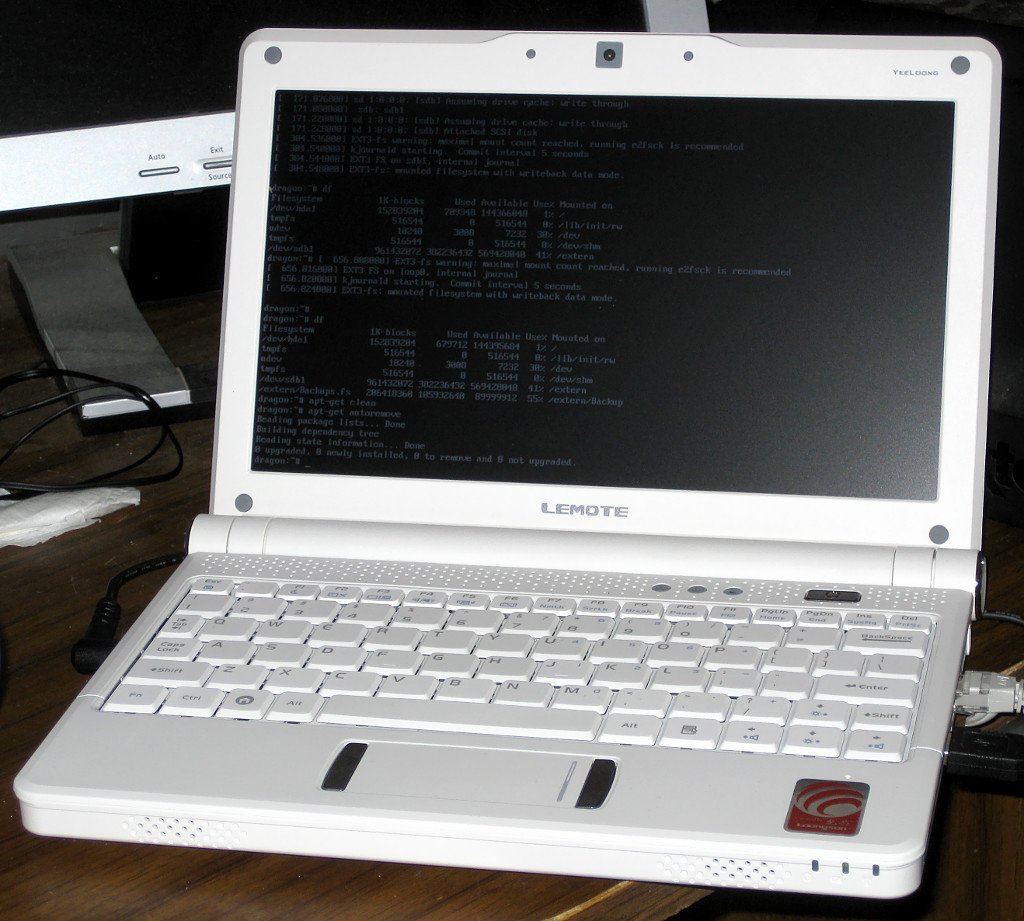
Lemote Yeeloong 8101B

The Yeeloong netbook computer is intended to be built on free software from the BIOS upwards, and for this reason is used and recommended by the founder of Free Software Foundation, Richard Stallman as of September 2008 and 23 January 2010.

The specifications are:

Model	8101B	8089B	8089D
Processor	Loongson 2F, 800-900 MHz, integrated DDR2 SDRAM memory controller		
Chipset	Northbridge: integrated in CPU		
Chipset	Southbridge: AMD CS5536		
Graphics	SiliconMotion SMI712, 4 MiB of video RAM		
Memory	DDR2 SDRAM 1024 MB		
Hard drive	Serial ATA 160 GB		Solid-state drive 8 GB
Audio	Speaker, microphone		
Network	Wi-Fi (RTL8139, RTL8187B), 10/100 Mbit, 802.11 b/g		
Screen size	10.1" TFT LCD	8.9" TFT LCD	
Resolution	1024 x 600		
Camera	300K pixel		
Operating system	Red Flag Linux, Debian, FSF distributions		
Interface type	3x USB 2.0		2x USB 2.0
Interface type	1x VGA, 1x RJ45, 1x DC-in		
Interface type	Earphone + microphone, 1x SD (reader supports SDHC)		
Dimensions (mm)	255 L × 188 H × 250 T		
Weight (kg)	1.1		

==== Loongson 3A laptop ====
Loongson insiders revealed a new model based on the Loongson 3A quad-core laptop has been developed and was expected to launch in August 2011. With a similar design to the MacBook Pro from Apple Inc., it will carry a Linux operating system by default.

In September 2011, Lemote announced the Yeeloong-8133 13.3" laptop featuring 900 MHz, quad-core Loongson-3A/2GQ CPU.

=== Desktop computers ===
- Lynloong, all-in-one desktop computer, combined computer and monitor, without keyboard.
- Myloong, desktop diskless network computer (NC), without monitor or keyboard.
- Fuloong, see below.

=== Products in development ===
Hiloong, SOHO and family storage center.

== Fuloong 2 series of small desktop computers ==
The Fuloong 2 series is a desktop computer that costs CN¥1,015, €100, US$131. It ships with two Linux distributions, Debian and Rays Linux, but any other distribution that has a mipsel port can be installed, e.g. Gentoo Linux.

=== Fuloong 2E ===
Lemote Fuloong 2E
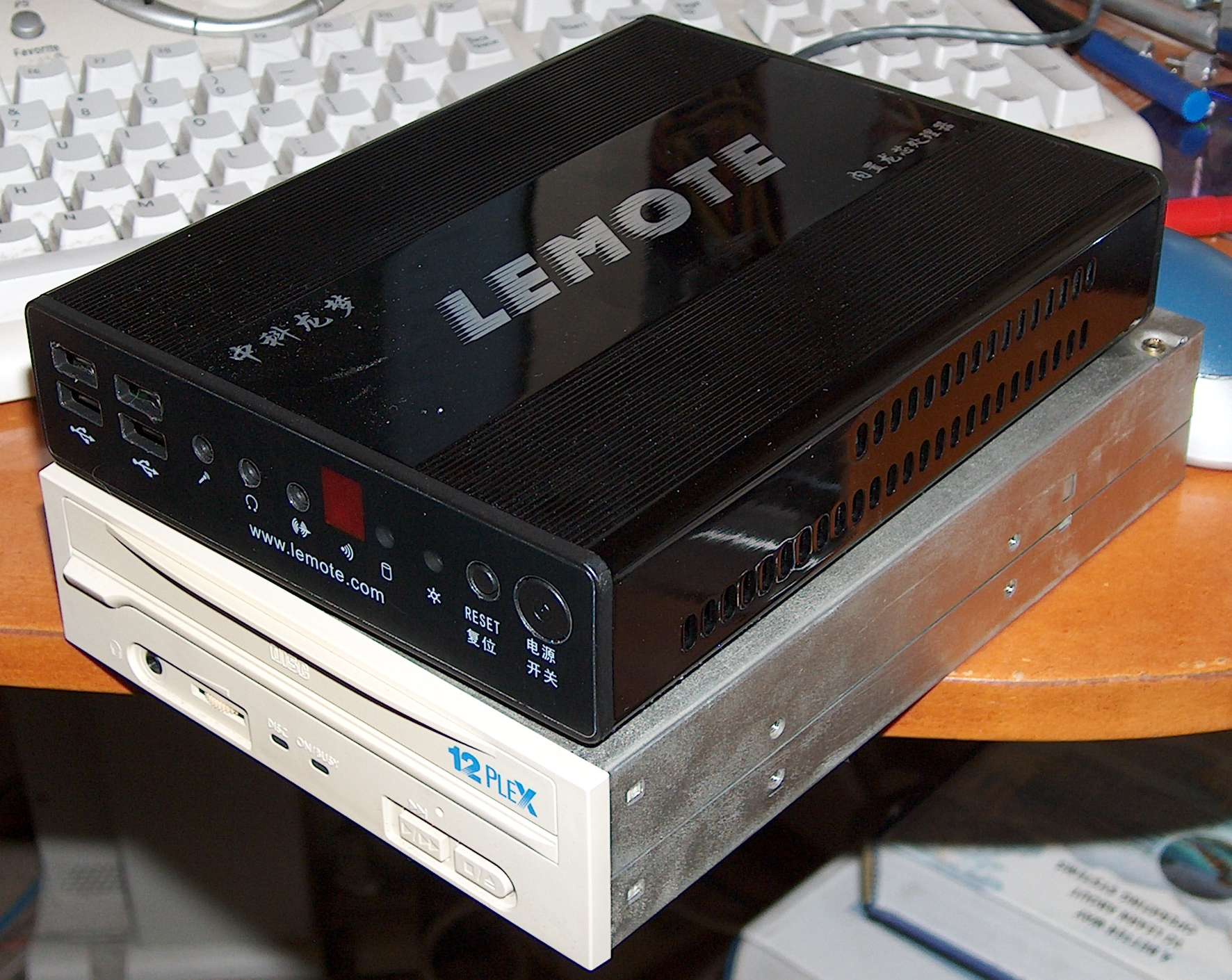
- Lemote Fuloong 2E
- Manufacturer: Menglan Group
- Type: Personal computer
- Media: 40–60 GB IDE hard disk
- Operating system: Linux (Xinhua, Sunwah/RAYS, or Debian)
- CPU: Loongson III 64-bit CPU
- Memory: 256 MiB DDR SDRAM
- Input: Keyboard
- Connectivity: 10/100 Mb/s Ethernet
- Dimensions: 181 mm (7.1 in) H; 145 mm (5.7 in) W; 37 mm (1.5 in) D

The reference hardware specifications as of 28 October 2006 are:

- Dimensions: 18.8 × 14.5 cm
- CPU: Loongson 2E 64-bit, integrated DDR controller, 64 KiB cache level
- Clock speed: 667 MHz
- Southbridge: VIA VT82C686B
- DDR SDRAM: 256 MiB
- Hard disk: IDE 40–60 GB
- Video card: ATI Radeon 7000M (RV100) 16MB PCI
- Network controller: Realtek 8139D, 10/100 Mbit/s
- USB ports: 4
- Power supply: external 12V 4A DC

=== Fuloong 2F ===
The Fuloong 2F computer was released on 30 June 2008, priced at CN¥1,800, about €163, $257.

The specifications are:

- Dimensions: 19 × 14.5 × 3.7 cm
- CPU: Loongson 2F, integrated DDR2 controller
- Clock speed: 1 GHz
- Southbridge: AMD CS5536
- DDR2 SDRAM: 512 MB
- Hard disk: IDE 120 GB
- Video card: XGA V2, 32 MB video RAM, with VGA, DVI and S-video ports
- Network controller: Ethernet, Realtek RTL 8110SC, 1000 Mbit/s
- USB ports: 2.0, 4
- Infrared receiver
- Power supply: external 12 V power adapter
- Operating system: Xinhua Hualay Rays 2.0, which is a Linux distribution that supports MIPS architecture. Fuloong 2F also works well with other Linux distributions, OpenBSD, and NetBSD.

=== Fuloong Mini-PC ===
The specifications are:

Model	FL6004	FL6014	FL6005	FL6015
Processor	Loongson 2F, 800 900 MHz, integrated DDRII memory controller			
Chipset	Northbridge: integrated in CPU			
Chipset	Southbridge: AMD CS5536			
Graphics	Silicon Integrated Systems 315PRO, 32 MB video memory			
Memory	DDRII 512 MB, support up to 1 GB			
Hard drive	SATA 160 or 320 GB	SSD 8 GB	SATA 160 GB	SSD 8 GB
Audio	AC'97 Realtek ALC 655			
Network	Realtek RTL 8110SC 1000 Mbit/s			
Operating system	Redflag Linux, Debian			
Interface type	4 USB2.0			
Interface type	VGA DVI S-video		VGA	
Interface type	IR interface		-	
Dimension	L × H × T = 181 × 145 × 37 mm			
Weight	0.78 kg			

== Software ==
Lemote has participated in development and MIPS-porting of Debian Linux, eCos, MicroC/OS-II, VxWorks, Microsoft Windows CE, Java, OpenOffice.org and Yongzhong Office by Wuxi Yongzhong Tech Co. It also develops a Loongson processor simulator based on GXemul. In part to its ability to run only libre software, without proprietary binary blobs, Richard Stallman famously used the Lemote Yeeloong.

== See also ==
- OLPC XO-1, also called the $100 Laptop project
- Classmate PC, a low cost machine developed by Intel
- Sinomanic Tianhua GX-1C, part of a line of affordable machines developed by Sinomanic in China
- Simputer, an earlier project to construct cheap handheld computers in India
- VIA pc-1 Initiative, a project of VIA Technologies to help bridge the digital divide
