= Noahpad =

Model of small laptop released in 2007

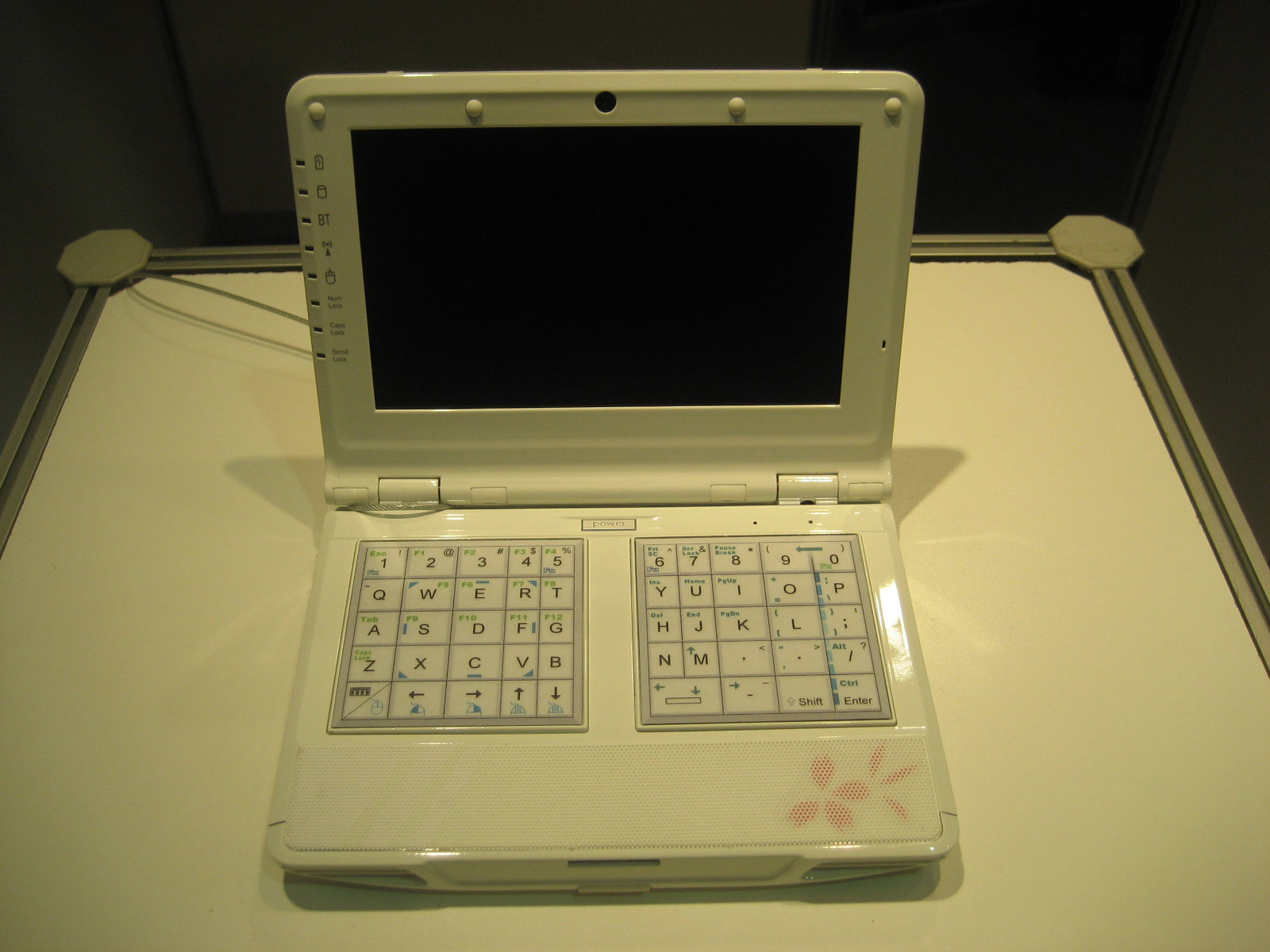
White E-Lead Noahpad front.

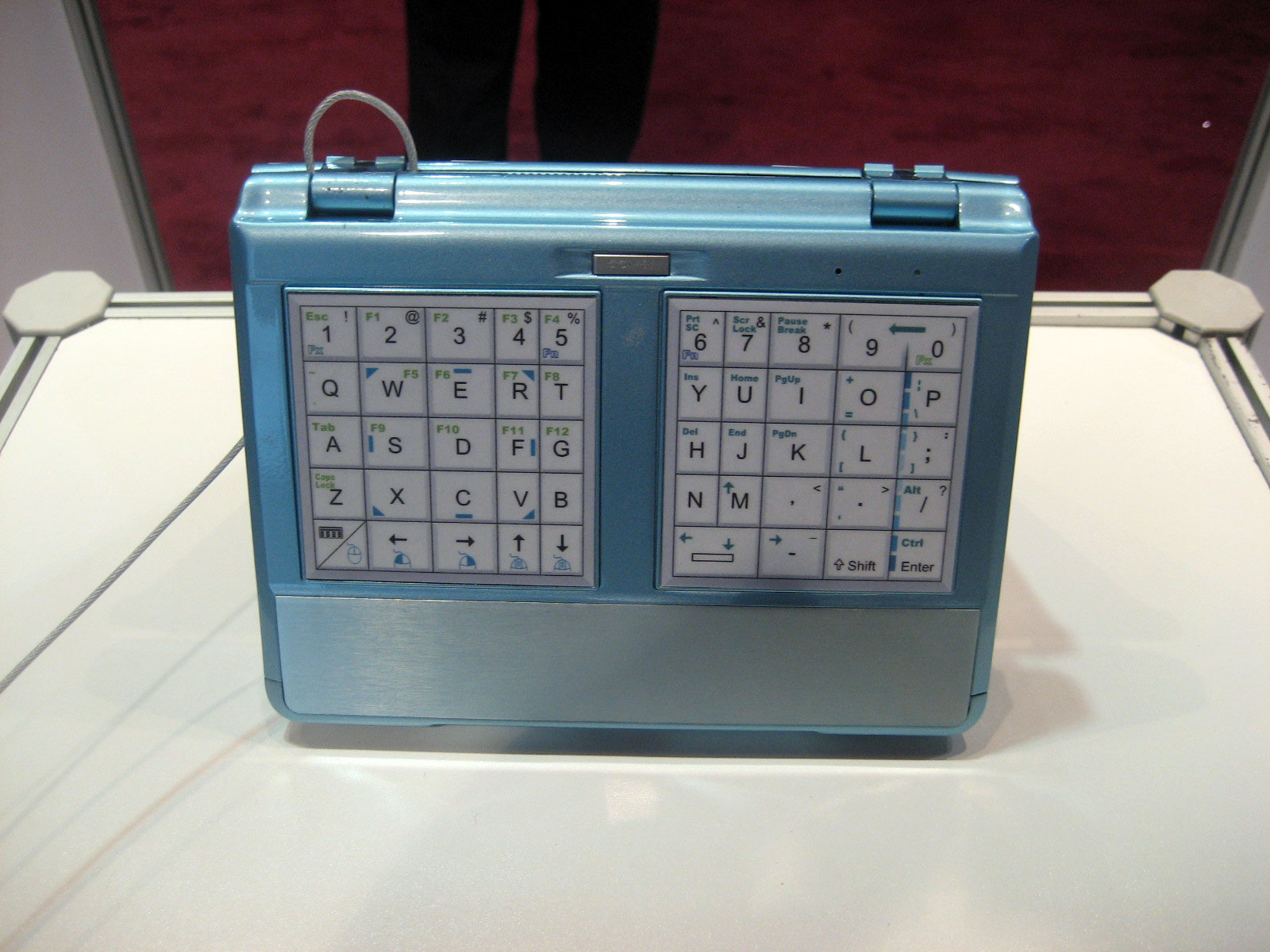
Blue E-Lead Noahpad keyboard.

The Noahpad is a Netbook developed by the Taiwanese company E-Lead. This small laptop shares some similar characteristics with other Netbooks launched in 2007, like the ASUS Eee PC, the OLPC XO and the Classmate PC.

The product was first presented at CES 2008, Las Vegas.

The device's specifications are as follows:

- Display: 7" 800 × 480 pixel LCD panel with LED backlight
- Operating system: Ubuntu 7.10
- Processor: VIA C7-M ULV Processor (ultra-low voltage), clocked at 1 GHz
- Graphics: VIA CX700 chipset
- Hard drive: 30 GB 1.8" HDD and SD card slot
- RAM: 512 MB DDR2
- Connectivity: 802.11b/g WLAN, 10/100 Ethernet, DVI-I port and two USB 2.0 ports.
- Camera: 300K pixel
- Audio: Built-in microphone and stereo speakers. 3.5mm microphone / earphone jack.
- Battery: 4 Cells, 3900 mAh. 4 Cells, 10000 mAh external pack also available.
- Dimensions: 192 × 143 × 29 mm
- Weight: 780 g

== Input device ==
The Noahpad's input device can function as both a keyboard and a pointing device. When used as a pointing device to control a mouse cursor, it provides a touchpad surface 70 × 70mm in size. When used as a keyboard, users push down on an area of the touch sensitive surface which is marked with a keyboard layout. Tactile feedback is provided by having the whole pad depress several millimeters when pressed.
