= Asus Eee T91 =

Touchscreen laptop

The Asus Eee T91 is a touchscreen netbook from the Asus Eee PC range. It is similar in specification to other netbooks, but features an 8.9" rotatable touchscreen and a retractable stylus.

With the release of Windows 7, Asus released the T91MT with a capacitive touchscreen, designed for multitouch.

== Development ==
Details of the T91 were first released at CES 2009. It was known to have a standard netbook configuration, with the addition of a rotatable touchscreen which could be used as an input. It was expected to be released in summer 2009, and was officially released on the week beginning 1 June.

== Features and specifications ==
The netbook has a fairly average specification with respect to other models. Its specifications are:

- Intel Atom Z520 Processor
- 1 GB RAM
- 16 GB solid state drive, 16 GB SD card, 20 GB Eee Storage
- 8.9-inch LED-lit resistive touchscreen (1024×600)
- 0.3 MP webcam and microphone above screen
- 1 VGA port (D-sub 15-pin for external monitor)
- 2 USB 2.0 ports
- 2 SD Card slots
- 2 Audio jacks: Headphone / Mic-in
- WLAN 802.11b/g/n (draft)
- Bluetooth V2.1
- 225 mm × 164 mm × 25.2–28.4 mm
- 0.96 kg weight
- Windows XP Home
- Tablet-specific software ("touchsuite") for taking notes, presenting images and touch-enabled browsing with an on-screen keyboard

== See also ==
- Comparison of Netbooks (example: Asus EEE T101MT)
