= Glossy display =

Electronic display with a glossy surface

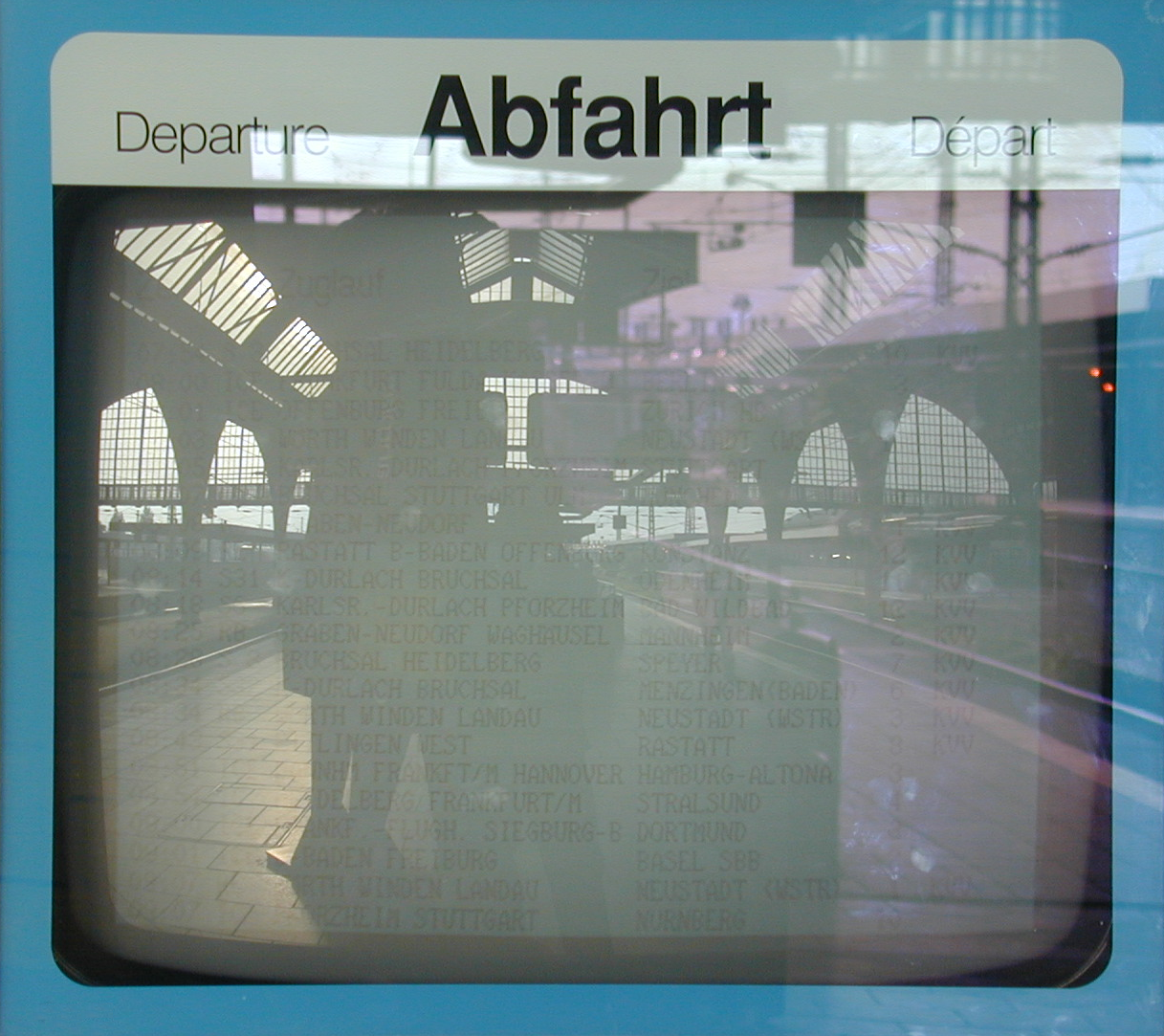
Railway timetable shown on a CRT display with reflective vandal-proof cover glass, exhibiting distinct reflections from ambient light sources (sky, lamps). The visual information can only be read (with very low contrast) in the regions with shadow.

A glossy display is an electronic display with a glossy surface. In certain light environments, glossy displays provide better color intensity and contrast ratios than matte displays. The primary disadvantage of these displays is their tendency to reflect any external light, often resulting in an undesirable glare.

== Technology ==
Some LCDs use an anti-reflective coating, or nanotextured glass surface, to reduce the amount of external light reflecting from the surface without affecting light emanating from the screen as an alternative to matte display.

== Disadvantages ==
Because of the reflective nature of the display, in most lighting conditions that include direct light sources facing the screen, glossy displays create reflections, which can be distracting to the user of the computer. This can be especially distracting to users working in an environment where the position of lights and windows are fixed, such as in an office, as these create unavoidable reflections on glossy displays.

== Adverse health effects ==
Ergonomic studies show that prolonged work in the office environment with the presence of discomforting glares and disturbances from light reflections on the screen can cause mild to severe health effects, ranging from eye strain and headaches to photosensitive epileptic episodes. These effects are usually explained by the physiology of the human eye and the human visual system. The image of light sources reflected in the screen can cause the human visual system to focus on that image, which is usually at a much farther distance than the information shown on the screen. This competition between two images that can be focused is considered to be the primary source of such effects.

== Advantages ==
In controlled environments, such as darkened rooms, or rooms where all light sources are diffused, glossy displays create more saturated colors, deeper blacks, brighter whites, and are sharper than matte displays. This is why supporters of glossy screens consider these types of displays more appropriate for viewing photographs and watching films.

== See also ==
- Optical coating
- List of glossy display branding manufacturers
