= Silver Nano =

Antibacterial technology

- Hangul: 은나노
- Hanja: 銀나노
- RR: eunnano
- MR: ŭnnano

Silver Nano (Silver Nano Health System) is a trademark name of an antibacterial technology which uses silver nanoparticles in washing machines, refrigerators, air conditioners, air purifiers and vacuum cleaners introduced by Samsung in April 2003.

== Benefits ==
Samsung home appliances, such as refrigerators or air conditioners, have a silver nano coating on their inner surfaces for an overall anti-bacterial and anti-fungal effect. As air circulates, the coated surfaces contact with the silver ions which can resist any airborne bacteria, which in turn suppress the respiration of bacteria, adversely affects bacteria's cellular metabolism and inhibits cell growth.

Samsung says the silver nano technology sterilizes over 650 types of bacteria and that "Samsung WM1245A Washing Machine releases over 400 billion silver ions which penetrate deeply into fabrics of any kind and create a coat of sterilizing protection for a maximum of 99.99% disinfection and an added antibacterial effect of up to 30 days after washing".

According to Paul Lipscomb, Product Manager, White Goods, Samsung Australia: "The Silver Wash system means that it's no longer necessary to soak clothes in additives or wash at extremely high temperatures in order to sanitise them. This combined with Samsung front loading washing machine's industry leading water efficiency ratings of up to 5A, creates a major saving on the long term cost of running the washing machine."

In 2005 the South Korean Consumer Protection Board concluded Samsung's Silver Wash technology was exaggerated in advertisements, due to test results which showed 99.9% removal of germs by similar drum-type washers of LG Electronics, Daewoo Electronics, and Whirlpool.

Samsung rebutted the accusation, saying their products are still superior because they remove 99.999 percent of germs, rather than the 99.9–99.99 percent removed by the other washers.

== Environmental concerns ==
The German branch of Friends of the Earth, Bund für Umwelt und Naturschutz Deutschland (BUND), has asked consumers not to buy a new type of washing machine that uses silver nanoparticles. BUND criticized the product, claiming that considerable amounts of silver could enter sewage plants and seriously trouble the biological purification process of waste water. Friends of the Earth has also claimed that silver nanoparticles have a toxic effect on different kinds of living cells.

Samsung countered that only an accumulated amount of 0.05 grams of silver is released per machine, per year, while the released silver-ions quickly bind to non-nano-sized structures in the water. This then raises the question of what structures Samsung thinks these nanoparticles will bind to that they will not later come into contact with marine life.

== Regulation ==
In Silver Nanotechnologies and the Environment, environmental toxicologist Dr. Samuel Luoma claims that widespread use of nanoscale silver will challenge regulatory agencies to balance important potential benefits against the possibility of significant environmental risk. As of August 21, 2008, the Project on Emerging Nanotechnologies estimates that at least 235 manufacturer-identified silver nanotech products are publicly available.

== See also ==
- Silver compounds
- Colloidal silver
- Environmental implications of nanotechnology
