= Matte display =

Electronic display with a matte surface

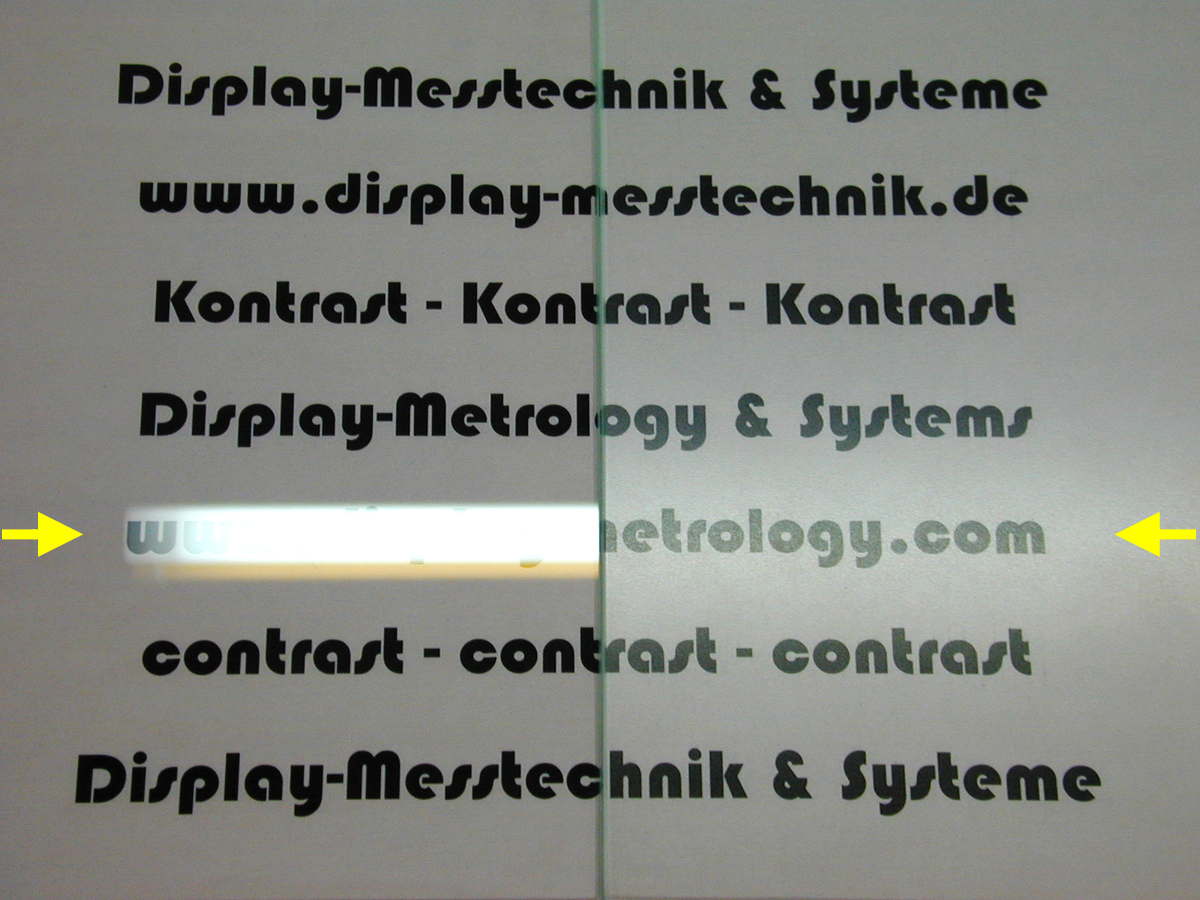
Reflection of a fluorescent ceiling light, as seen in a glossy screen (left) and matte screen (right)

A matte display is an electronic display with a matte surface. Matte displays feature a light-scattering antireflection layer, which reduces reflectivity at the cost of decreased contrast and color intensity under dimly lit conditions. If the steep nanostructures are used – etched in the surface – a matte display can achieve an effect that is similar to continuous refraction index reduction.

The image quality in displays with matte finish is not as sharp or bright as a glossy screen but is easier to color-match and calibrate with a printer.

== See also ==
- Anti-reflective coating
- Glossy display
- Nanotextured surface
