= One A110 =

One netbook computer

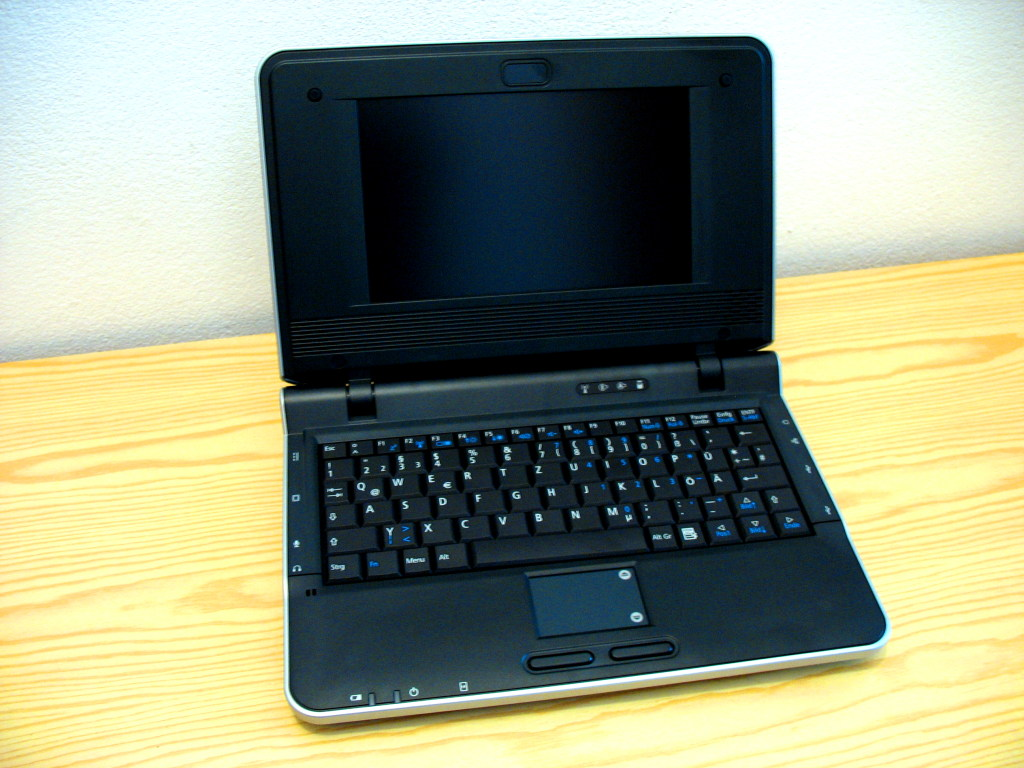
One A110 subnotebook

The A110 is a netbook computer by One. It is built on a reference design by Quanta Computer and was announced to run Linpus Linux. However, some or all of the first batch have actually been delivered with a modified Ubuntu Linux installed, using SquashFS to fit the system in the 2 GB flash memory.

== Hardware specifications ==
- VIA C7-M-ULV Processor (1.0 GHz, 400-MHz FSB, max. 3.5 Watt)
- 7-inch display 800×480 (with external VGA port)
- 512 MB DDR2 PC400 RAM
- 64 MB S3VX800 integrated graphics card
- 2 GB flash memory
- 2× USB 2.0 ports
- 1× Microphone-in jack
- 1× Speaker jack
- 56 kbit/s Modem
- 10/100 Mbit/s LAN
- WLAN
- 3-in-1 Cardreader, SD/MMC/MS
- Height: 2.8 cm
- Width: 24.3 cm
- Depth: 17.1 cm
- Weight: 950 g

A second model called A120 is available with 4 GB of flash memory (compared to the 2 GB of the A110), a webcam and Windows XP.
