= Comparison of netbook-oriented Linux distributions =

A netbook computer is a small laptop computer, with a screen size between about 7 to 12 inches and low power use. They use either a solid state disk (SSD) or a hard disk drive (HDD) for storage, have up to 2 gigabytes of random-access memory (RAM), but often less, lack an optical disk drive, and usually have Universal Serial Bus (USB), Ethernet, Wi-Fi and often Bluetooth connectivity. The name emphasizes their use as portable Internet appliances.

== Netbook distributions ==
There are special Linux distributions, called netbook distributions, for these machines. All such distributions purport to be optimized for use with small, low-resolution displays. They tend to include a broad mix of Voice over IP (VOIP) and web-focused tools, including proprietary applications rarely seen installed by default by mainstream desktop distributions. For example, Nokia Maemo, and Asus' customized Xandros both ship with Skype and Adobe Flash installed, and the Ubuntu Netbook Edition offers the option to do the same for original equipment manufacturers (OEMs).

== Comparison ==
=== Features ===
Distribution	Working state	Aim	Creator	Producer	Base distribution	Installed size (MB)	Initial release date	Interface	Linux kernel	Default file system	Architecture support	Precompiled packages: approximate number	Default package manager tools	Default installer
Aurora	2009 Last release, discontinued	Asus Eee PC optimized	Eeebuntu community		Ubuntu		2009-05-15	GNOME or GNOME + Netbook Remix	Array kernel (modified kernel)				APT	
CrunchBang Linux 11-20130119	2015-02-06 Discontinued	Limited hardware machines	Philip Newborough		Debian		2013-01-19	Openbox	3.2.35		x86 + x86-64		APT	
Debian Eee PC		Asus Eee PC			Debian									
Debian Wheezy					Written from scratch						i386, x86-64, PowerPC, SPARC, ARM, armhf, MIPS, S390, s390x, Loongson			
EasyPeasy 1.6	2012 Last release, discontinued	All netbooks	EasyPeasy Community	Jon Ramvi	Ubuntu		2010-04-24	GNOME + Netbook Remix	2.6.32	ext4	x86		APT	Ubiquity
Eeedora		Asus Eee PC 701	Martin Andrews		Fedora			Xfce					RPM	
Firefly Linux 1.0 Beta 1	2009 Last release, discontinued		Firefly Linux community		Arch Linux			LXDE	2.6.29.4		x86		Pacman	
Fuduntu	2013-04-14 Last release, discontinued	All netbooks	Andrew Wyatt "Fewt"	Fuduntu.org	None (originally based on Fedora 14)		2012-10-01	GNOME	3.6.9	ext4	x86 + x86-64		RPM + YUM	
gNewSense		Free software	Brian Brazil and Paul O'Malley	Sam Geeraerts with sponsorship from the FSF	Debian				Linux-libre 2.6.32		Loongson, x86, x86-64		APT	Ubiquity (software)
Joli OS 1.2 (formerly named Jolicloud)	2013-11-22 Last release, discontinued	All netbooks	Joli OS	Joli OS	Ubuntu		2011-03-09	HTML5 + GNOME	2.6.35.10	ext4	x86		APT	
Kuki Linux 2.0	2009 Last release, discontinued	Aspire One optimized	Kuki Linux community		Ubuntu			Xfce						
Linux4One 1.5		Aspire One optimized	Linux4One community		Ubuntu			GNOME or LXDE						
Leeenux Linux v10	2016 Last release	All netbooks	Aleksandar Ciric		Ubuntu 16.04 LTS			LXDE, XFCE		ext4	x86, AMD64		APT, Synaptic, Software center	Ubiquity
Leeenux 2020	Supported until April 2023	All netbooks	Aleksandar Ciric		Ubuntu 18.04 LTS			LXDE, XFCE			x86, AMD64		APT, Synaptic, Software center	
Lubuntu 15.10	2015-10-22 Active Development	Limited hardware machines	Lubuntu Community and LXDE Foundation		Ubuntu		2011-10-13	LXDE					Synaptic	
Manjaro Netbook Edition	2015-07-25 Active Development	All netbooks	Rob McCathie	Manjaro Linux	Arch Linux			Xfce	Intel Atom-optimized Manjaro kernel	ext4	x86, x86-64		Pamac (graphical frontend for pacman)	
Midinux		All netbooks	Red Flag Linux				2007			ext3	x86			
MeeGo 1.2	2012 Last release, discontinued	Intel Atom processor netbooks, Nokia ARM smartphones	Intel, Nokia, Maemo community	Intel, Nokia, Linux Foundation	None (it is a distribution developed out of Maemo and Moblin)		2010-10-28	"Netbook User Experience" (based on Clutter)	2.6.35	btrfs	x86 with SSSE3 support		RPM	
Moblin 2.1	2009-04 Last release, discontinued	All Intel Atom processor netbooks and MID	Intel	Intel/Linux Foundation	None (borrows components for various distributions)		2009-11-04	Clutter					RPM (may change)	
OpenGeeeU 8.10	2012-08 Last release, discontinued		Luca De Marini		EasyPeasy		2009-03-23	Enlightenment plus GNOME	2.6.27	ext3	x86	26000	APT	Ubiquity
Puppeee Linux 4.3X	Linpus is 64-bit only	Asus Eee PCs with Intel Chipsets	Jemimah Ruhala		Puppy Linux 4.3.1	200MB		Choice of: IceWM, OpenBox, Flwm with ROX-Filer, PcManFM, LxLauncher	2.6.33	AUFS + SquashFS + EXT2	Atom / CeleronM		Pet	PetGet
Trisquel Mini	2014-11 Last release, discontinued	Limited hardware machines			Trisquel		2010-09							
Ubuntu Netbook Edition 10.10	2010-10 Last release, discontinued	Intel Atom processor netbooks	Canonical	Canonical	Ubuntu		2010-10-10	Unity	2.6.32		x86	32000	APT	
Distribution	Working state	Aim	Creator	Producer	Base distribution	Installed size (MB)	Initial release date	Interface	Linux kernel	Default file system	Architecture support	Precompiled packages: approximate number	Default package manager tools	Default installer

==== Specific Features ====
Distribution	Target Boot Time	Whole OS Loads to RAM (Default)	LIVE Medium	Target Users	SSD Write Optimization (SSD degradation, I/O optimization, etc.)	Specific Supported Hardware
Aurora 3.0						
EasyPeasy 1.6			LIVE Medium	Beginner, highly mobile netbook users		
Eeedora						
Firefly Linux 1.0 Beta 1						
Joli OS 1.2						
Kuki Linux 2.0						
Linux4One 1.5	40 seconds					
Manjaro Netbook Edition						
Moblin 2.0	5 seconds					
OpenGeeeU 8.10						
Puppeee Linux 4.3X	30s	Loads to RAM			Layered filesystem - caches writes in RAM	Lightweight kernel compiled for EeePCs only
Ubuntu Netbook Edition 10.10						

== See also ==
- Android
- List of Linux distributions that run from RAM
- List of tools to create Live USB systems
