= Dell Inspiron Mini series =

Line of computers by Dell

- Developer: Dell
- Manufacturer: Dell
- Product family: Inspiron
- Type: Subnotebook/netbook
- Released: 2008-2010
- Operating system: Dell Ubuntu Netbook Remix; Microsoft Windows XP
- Successor: Dell

The Dell Inspiron Mini Series is a discontinued line of subnotebook/netbook computers designed by Dell. The series was introduced in September 2008 amidst the growing popularity of low-cost netbook computers introduced by competitors.

Inspiron Mini models
		2008	2009	2010
12"	Main	12 (1210)		
10"	Main	10 (1010)	10 (1012)	(1018)
10"	Main		10n	
10"	Value	10v (1011)		
9"	Value	9 (910)		

== 9 Series ==
Mini 9
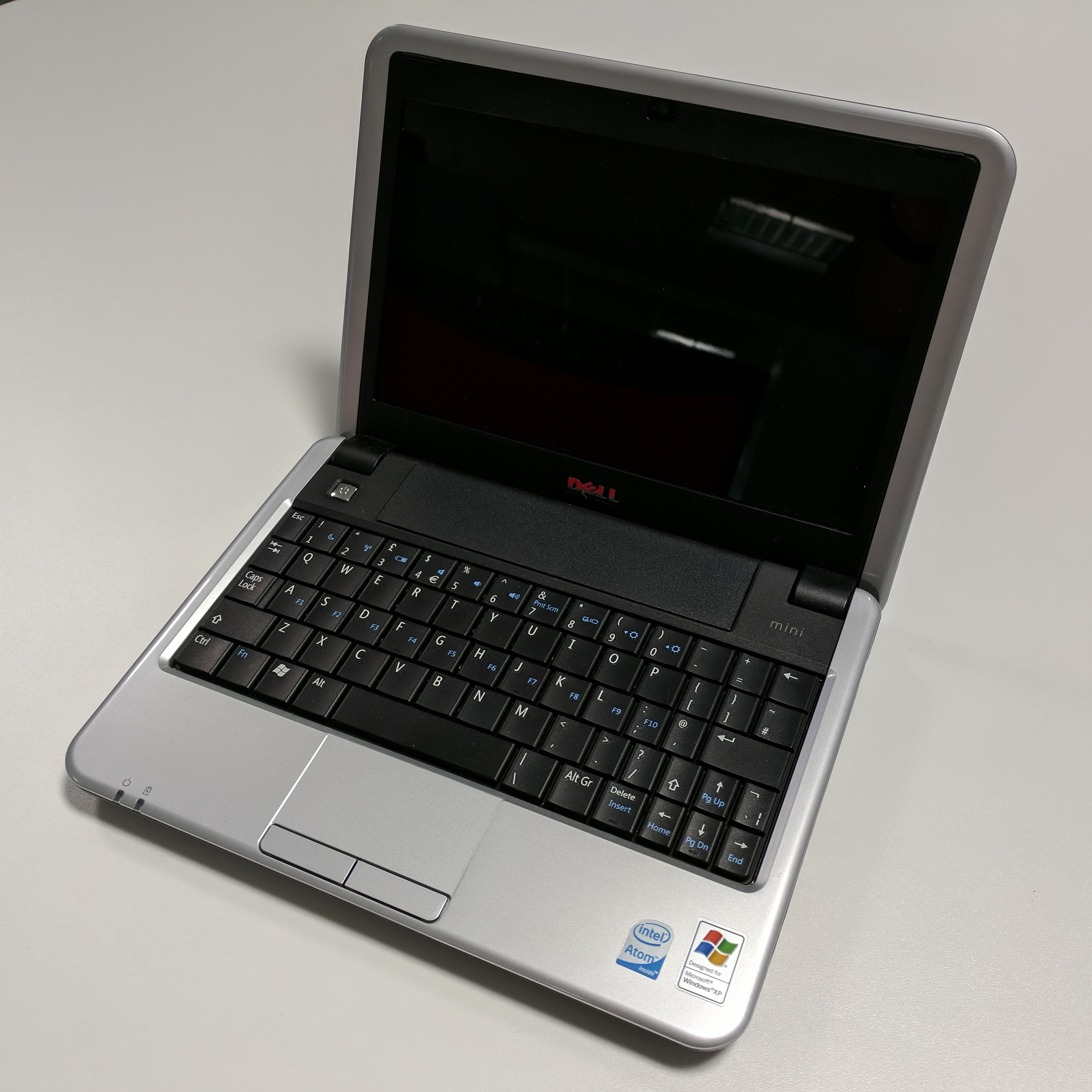
- A Dell Inspiron Mini 9
- Introductory price: Starting at $349, $359, or $409 with Ubuntu (8.04-10.00); or starting at $399, $499 with Windows XP and features
- Discontinued: May 29, 2009
- Operating system: Windows XP Home ULCPC SP3, Dell Ubuntu Netbook Remix with and without Moblin
- CPU: Diamondville Intel Atom N270 (1.6 GHz/533Mhz FSB/512K cache)
- Memory: 512 MB, 1GB or 2GB
- Storage: 4/8/16/32/64 GB SSD
- Display: Glossy 8.9" (22.6 cm) 1024x600 LCD (133 dpi)
- Input: Keyboard; Touchpad; Microphone; 0.3 or 1.3 Megapixel Webcam
- Connectivity: 10/100 Mbit Ethernet; 802.11b/g wireless LAN; Bluetooth Optional/Standard (depends on region); VGA 15-pin output Audio; headphone/mic jacks 3 USB 2.0 ports 4-in-1 Flash Memory card reader, WWAN (Mobile Internet)
- Weight: 2.28 lb (1.03 kg)

The Dell Inspiron Mini 9 (also called the Inspiron 910), was announced on September 4, 2008, as a netbook set to contend with other low-cost ultra-portables such as the ASUS Eee PC and Acer Aspire One. The Mini 9 was also sold as the Dell Vostro A90 by the Dell Small Business Unit.

The Mini 9 began shipping on September 16, 2008, starting at US$349. It is built by Compal Electronics, which also makes the MSI Wind Netbook and the HP Mini-Note 2133.

It is Dell's first netbook. It was retired on May 29, 2009.

=== Features ===
==== SSD/Ubuntu Netbook Remix ====
Dell initially shipped versions of the Mini 9 with only partially usable storage, after models were built using a software image that fit just the basic 4 GB SSD. Standard operating system upgrades later fixed the issue.

==== SSD ====
The Mini 9 uses a very special SSD drive. It is a 50 mm solid-state module (MO-300A) with mini PCIe interface. It uses IDE/PATA signal, so replacing it with a module with SATA signal won't work, although it will fit in the socket.

==== Battery capacity ====
In January, it was suspected that some units were shipping with 24 watt-hour capacity batteries, labeled as 32 watt-hours. The low-capacity batteries appear to be those manufactured in Tokyo. It was later determined that the software used to examine the batteries was incorrectly reporting the capacity and has since been reported to be fixed with an upgrade of the BIOS.

=== Specifications ===
- Processor: Intel Atom N270.
- Memory: 512 MB, 1 GB or 2 GB of shared dual-channel DDR2 SDRAM @ 533 MHz.
- Chipset: Intel US15W Express.
- Graphics: integrated Intel GMA 950.
- LCD: 8.9" LED-backlit widescreen with 1024 × 600 resolution.
- Storage: 8 or 16 GB SSD (Windows XP Home Edition SP3 32-bit), or 32 GB (Ubuntu Linux version 8.04.1) SSD.
- Optical Drive: None; External USB 8X tray-load dual-layer DVD+/-RW.
- Battery: 4-cell (32 Whr) lithium-ion battery.
- Camera: 0.3 MP webcam.
- Wi-Fi Card: Dell Wireless 1395 802.11g mini-card.
- Bluetooth: Dell Wireless Bluetooth Internal 350 (2.0).
- I/O ports: 3 USB 2.0 ports, 1 Fast Ethernet port, 1 3-in-1 memory card reader, 1 VGA output, 1 headphone jack, 1 microphone jack, and 1 power adapter port.

== 10 Series ==
=== Dell Inspiron Mini 10 (1010) ===
The Mini 10 (1010) is a netbook with a 10.1" screen that was designed to fill the gap between the Mini 9 and Mini 12. It began shipping on February 26, 2009 with a base price of US$399.

It has the Intel Atom Z520 and Z530 processor configurations. The default Mini 10 model has a 16:9 widescreen display with a 1024×600 (originally 1024×576) or 1366×768 (described as 720p) HD resolution and an HDMI port. It uses the Poulsbo chipset. It can be customized with GPS or integrated TV tuner. The service manual displays two full-height MiniPCI-E internal slots, and one half-height. It is unclear whether the connectors are all in place, but the manual shows one full-height TV tuner in place.

The device also features a multitouch touchpad. Provided with a driver from Elantech, it can be used for scrolling, 3 button operation, dragging, resizing, rotating pictures and system shortcuts as Start Menu and Explorer (on Windows), browser back and forward, minimizing and maximizing windows, window switching, desktop showing and hiding, and running custom commands.

=== Dell Inspiron Mini 10v (1011) ===
To fill the gap left when the Mini 9 was discontinued, Dell introduced a 'value' version, the Inspiron Mini 10v, which ships with a standard VGA connector, 1024×600 resolution display (1024×576 on early models) and the same Atom N270 processor that the Mini 9 used (an optional upgrade to the N280 was briefly later available.) In fact, the 10v has nearly exactly the same hardware as the Mini 9 and, as such, is also able to run Linux. The Mini 10v has since been discontinued.

(The Dell Mini 10v is one of, if not the most, popular or 'compatible' netbook and/or laptop to be "Hackintoshed".)

==== Dell Inspiron Mini 10v Nickelodeon Slime Edition ====
The Inspiron Mini 10 Nickelodeon Slime Edition was created from a partnership between Dell and Nickelodeon. The laptop had a white lid with the “slime” design, ran Windows XP and had a custom “slime”-themed GUI made using StarDock's MyColors. It included parental controls using McAfee's Family Safety. System folders were blocked as well. The desktop featured gadgets linking to Nickelodeon's website and another that linked to Whyville.

=== Dell Inspiron Mini 10 (1012) ===
The Mini 10 (1012) has a similar form factor to the older Mini 10 (1010) and 10v (1011); it is distinguished by the use of the newer Atom n450 processor, and its supporting chipset. The HDMI port is also replaced with a standard VGA connector.

=== Dell Inspiron Mini 10n ===
Dell released the Mini 10n based on the Mini 10. The only difference between the 10n and the 10 (1012) is the installed OS has been changed to Ubuntu Moblin Remix Developer Edition, bridging Canonical's Ubuntu and Intel's Moblin graphical environment and Atom optimizations.

Dell no longer preinstalls full Ubuntu releases on the Mini 10n. Because this model uses a standard Intel platform, Ubuntu (or almost any other up-to-date Linux distribution) can be installed by an end user.

The Mini 10n hardware is the same as the newer version of the Mini 10 with the Atom N450 CPU, 160G disk and NM10 video. It does not have an available option to add the “media processor” upgrade as on the Windows version of the 1012 which can allow better performance for full-motion video, particularly from HD sources.

=== Dell Inspiron Mini (1018) ===
On August 19, 2010, Dell Europe announced the introduction of the Dell Mini 1018. This new Dell Mini features the Atom N455 CPU, which supports DDR3 memory. Design has also been tweaked, and stated specs include 7+ hours of battery life on the 6-cell battery (unconfirmed). As of January 2011, the model has been made available in Asia. The Asian release of the 1018 features 1 GB of DDR3 RAM and is shipped with Windows 7 Starter as well as Office 2010 starter.

However, the N455 is actually 64-bit and Hyper Threading capable, and thus is actually capable of running 64-bit variants of Windows 7.

=== Specification comparison ===
	Mini 10 (1010)	Mini 10v (1011)	Mini 10 (1012)	Mini 10v (1018)
Released	2009		2010	
Processor	Intel Atom Z520 (1.33 GHz); Intel Atom Z530 (1.60 GHz)	Intel Atom N270 (1.60 GHz); Intel Atom N280 (1.66 GHz)	Intel Atom N450 (1.66 GHz)	Intel Atom N455 (1.66 GHz)
Memory	1 GB DDR2 SDRAM; 2 GB DDR2 SDRAM			1 GB DDR3 SDRAM
Chipset	Intel US15W Express	Intel 945GSE Express	Intel NM10 Express	
Graphics Processor	Integrated Intel GMA 500 graphics	Integrated Intel GMA 950 graphics	Integrated Intel GMA 3150 graphics (Crystal HD Broadcom Media Accelerator optional)	Integrated Intel GMA 3150 graphics
Display Panel	10.1 in (26 cm) LED-backlit display with 1024 × 600 resolution; 10.1 in (26 cm) bright LED-backlit display with 1366 × 768 resolution and TrueLife; Early models had 1024×576 resolution	10.1 in (26 cm) LED-backlit display with 1024 × 600 resolution; Early models had 1024×576 resolution	10.1 in (26 cm) LED-backlit display with 1024 × 600 resolution; 10.1 in (26 cm) bright LED-backlit display with 1366 × 768 resolution and TrueLife	10.1 in (26 cm) LED-backlit display with 1024 × 600 resolution
Hard Drive	160 GB SATA at 5400 RPM; 32 GB SSD	160 GB SATA at 5400 RPM; 16 GB SSD	160 GB SATA at 5400 RPM 250 GB SATA at 5400 RPM	160 GB SATA at 5400 RPM; 250 GB SATA at 5400 RPM
Optical Disc Drive	None. External drive available.			
Battery	3-cell (24 Whr) Lithium-ion battery 6-cell (56 Whr) Lithium-ion battery	3-cell (24 Whr) Lithium-ion battery 6-cell (56 Whr) Lithium-ion battery	3-cell (24 Whr) Lithium-ion battery 6-cell (56 Whr) Lithium-ion battery Some batteries for this model had a capacity of 60 Whr	3-cell (24 Whr) Lithium-ion battery 6-cell (56 Whr) Lithium-ion battery
Wi-Fi Card	Dell Wireless 1397 802.11b/g; Dell Wireless 1510 802.11a/b/g/n mini-card		Dell Wireless 1397 802.11b/g	
Bluetooth	Internal Dell Wireless Bluetooth 365 (2.1 EDR)	Internal Dell Wireless Bluetooth 365 (2.1 EDR)		
Ports and Slots	1 Kensington lock slot; 3 USB 2.0 Ports; 1 Fast Ethernet port; 1 HDMI output; 1 headphone jack; 1 microphone jack; 1 3-in-1 memory card reader; 1 power adapter connector	1 Kensington lock slot 3 USB 2.0 Ports 1 Fast Ethernet port 1 VGA output 1 headphone jack 1 microphone jack 1 3-in-1 memory card reader 1 power adapter connector	1 Kensington lock slot 3 USB 2.0 Ports 1 Fast Ethernet port 1 VGA output 1 headphone jack 1 microphone jack 1 3-in-1 memory card reader 1 power adapter connector	
Camera	1.3 MP webcam	1.3 MP webcam	1.3 MP webcam	0.3 MP
Operating System				

== 12 Series ==
Mini 12
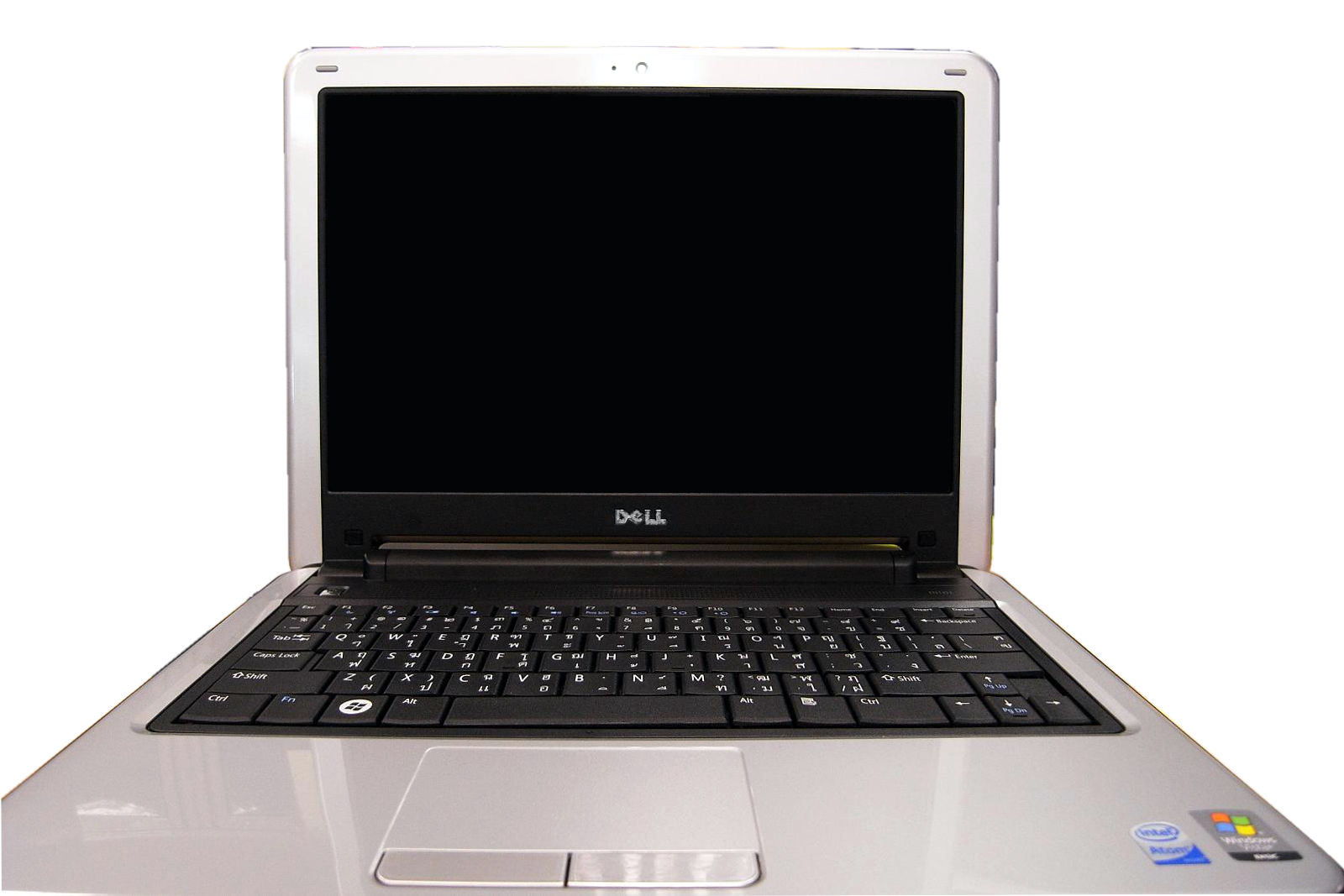
- Front view of the Dell Inspiron Mini 12.
- Operating system: Windows XP Pro
- CPU: Intel Atom Z520 or Z530
- Memory: 1 GB of shared dual-channel DDR2 SDRAM @ 533 MHz
- Storage: 40, 60 or 80 GB PATA HDD at 4200 RPM
- Display: 12.1" Glossy widescreen with a 1280×800 resolution and TrueLife
- Graphics: integrated Intel GMA 500
- Camera: 1.3 MP webcam
- Connectivity: 3 USB 2.0 ports, 1 Fast Ethernet port, 1 VGA output, 1 headphone jack, 1 microphone jack, 1 3-in-1 memory card reader and 1 power adapter connector
- Power: 3-cell (28 Whr) or 6-cell (56 WHr) lithium-ion battery.

The Dell Inspiron Mini 12 (also known as Dell Inspiron 1210) was released online on October 16, 2008 and announced on October 26, 2008 as a larger counterpart to the Mini 9. It was mainly created for the netbook market, with a secondary goal of competing with subnotebooks. It began shipping on December 8, 2008, with a starting price of $549. The netbook originally shipped with Windows Vista Home Basic SP1 32-bit, but an option for XP Home SP3 32-bit was added a month later. Furthermore, it was criticized for being slow with Vista. It was retired on August 7, 2009.

=== Features ===
It features a 12.1 inch (1280×800) WXGA True-Life widescreen display running on a 1.33 GHz or 1.6 GHz Intel Atom Silverthorne CPU, and comes bundled with Windows XP Home or Ubuntu 8.04. It comes with 1 GB of RAM (the maximum for the device), a 40/60/80 GB hard drive, and a small speaker located above the keyboard.

For connectivity, the device carries Wi-Fi and 3 USB ports. A 1.3 MP webcam and internal Bluetooth are available as options. The Dell Inspiron Mini 12 is 1.1 inches thick and weighs 3.2 pounds (with six-cell battery), or 2.8 pounds (with three-cell battery).

In dell black and silver colour. The outside is shiny black. On site one-year warranty by Dell.

=== Specifications ===
- Processor: Intel Atom Z520 or Z530.
- Memory: 512 MB or 1 GB of shared dual-channel DDR2 SDRAM @ 533 MHz.
- Chipset: Intel US15W Express.
- Graphics: integrated Intel GMA 500.
- Display: 12.1" LED-backlit widescreen with 1280 × 800 resolution.
- Storage: 32, 40 or 60 GB PATA HDD@ 5,400 RPM.
- Optical Drive: None; External USB 8X tray-load dual-layer DVD+/-RW.
- Battery: 3-cell (24 Whr) or 6-cell (48 Whr) lithium-ion battery.
- Camera: 1.3 MP webcam.
- Wi-Fi Card: Dell Wireless 1395 802.11g mini-card.
- Bluetooth: DelI Wireless Bluetooth Internal 350 (2.0).
- I/O ports: 3 USB 2.0 ports, 1 Fast Ethernet port, 1 3-in-1 memory card reader, 1 VGA output, 1 headphone jack, 1 microphone jack, and 1 power adapter port.

=== Successor ===
While not labelled an "Inspiron Mini" or marketed as a netbook, the Inspiron 11z has replaced the Mini 12 in most markets and occupies a similar position in the model line.

== See also ==
- Comparison of netbooks
- Dell Mini 5
- Quiet PC
