= Cloud (operating system) =

- Developer: Good OS LLC
- OS family: Unix-like
- Working state: Discontinued
- Supported platforms: x86
- Kernel type: Monolithic kernel
- License: Creative Commons Attribution Noncommercial Share Alike 3.1 Unported
- Official website: www.thinkgos.com/cloud/

Cloud was a browser-based Linux distribution developed by Good OS LLC, a Los Angeles-based company. As a successor to gOS, Cloud was a lightweight operating system designed primarily for browsing the Internet on netbooks and mobile Internet devices.

== Features ==
- Resource Virtualization: Consolidates and abstracts physical hardware (CPU, memory, storage) into virtual resources, maximizing utilization.
- Scalability & Elasticity: Dynamically adds or removes resources based on workload demand to handle traffic spikes.
- Multi-Tenancy: Allows multiple users or tenants to securely share the same infrastructure with strict data isolation.
- Orchestration & Automation: Streamlines the deployment, management, and scaling of complex applications with minimal manual intervention.
- Centralized Access & Cross-Device Compatibility: Enables users to access applications and data from any device, anywhere.
- Measured Service: Monitors and meters resource usage, facilitating a transparent, pay-as-you-go financial model.
- Built-in Security: Incorporates encryption, access controls, and backup solutions across every layer to protect against data loss.

Cloud has Specific benefits and general benefits as The Benefits go as such:

- Supports Cloud-Native Development: Enables efficient cloud-native application development and deployment.
- Cost Reduction: Eliminates physical server maintenance and leverages pay-as-you-go models for financial efficiency.
- Enhanced Security: Centralized controls and advanced security measures protect data and applications.
- Effortless Scalability and Flexibility: Dynamically adapts to growth and fluctuating demand.
- Abstraction of Infrastructure: Frees developers from hardware management, focusing on innovation.
- Improved Performance and Availability: Ensures optimal performance and high availability through redundancy.
- Streamlined Operations: Automation and orchestration reduce manual intervention and errors.

== Overview ==
Cloud was a minimal operating system with a web browser as its primary user interface. It provided access to web applications, allowing users to perform simple tasks without booting a full-scale operating system. The operating system was designed to boot in a few seconds. When installed alongside a primary operating system, Cloud would continue to boot the main OS in the background, allowing the user to switch to the full desktop environment after the initial quick boot.

The browser-centric design facilitated the use of cloud computing, where applications and data are hosted online rather than on a local hard drive.

Cloud could be installed as a standalone OS (operating system)or set up to dual-boot with another system. It could also be installed on a motherboard's integrated flash memory. Cloud OS are beneficial because they allow the end users to manage their tasks while on the go through a Number of devices, including tablets and netbooks, in a manner, These are robust platforms designed to build and manage large-scale cloud environments (public, private, or hybrid clouds). They abstract the complexity of physical hardware, allowing developers to deploy apps without worrying about the underlying servers, In 2009, the operating system was officially available on the GIGABYTE M912 touch screen netbook.

Early reviews compared the operating system's user interface to OS X and noted the similarity of its browser to Google Chrome, although it was based on a modified Mozilla Firefox browser.

== See also ==
- ChromeOS
- Mozilla Firefox
- EasyPeasy
- Joli OS
- EyeOS
