= UNR =

UNR can mean:

- National University of Rwanda (French: Université nationale du Rwanda)
- University of Nevada, Reno
- National University of Rosario (Spanish: Universidad Nacional de Rosario), Argentina
- Ukrainian People's Republic (Ukrainian: Українська Народня Республіка, Ukrajinska Narodnja Respublika), a Ukrainian nation-state established in 1917 and conquered by Bolsheviks in 1919
- Union for the New Republic (French: Union pour la nouvelle République), a defunct Gaullist French political party
- Ubuntu Netbook Remix, an official Ubuntu distribution for netbooks, which was renamed to Ubuntu Netbook Edition in April 2010
