= OpenGEU =

Free computer operating system

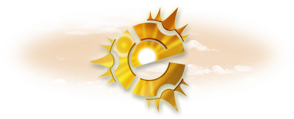

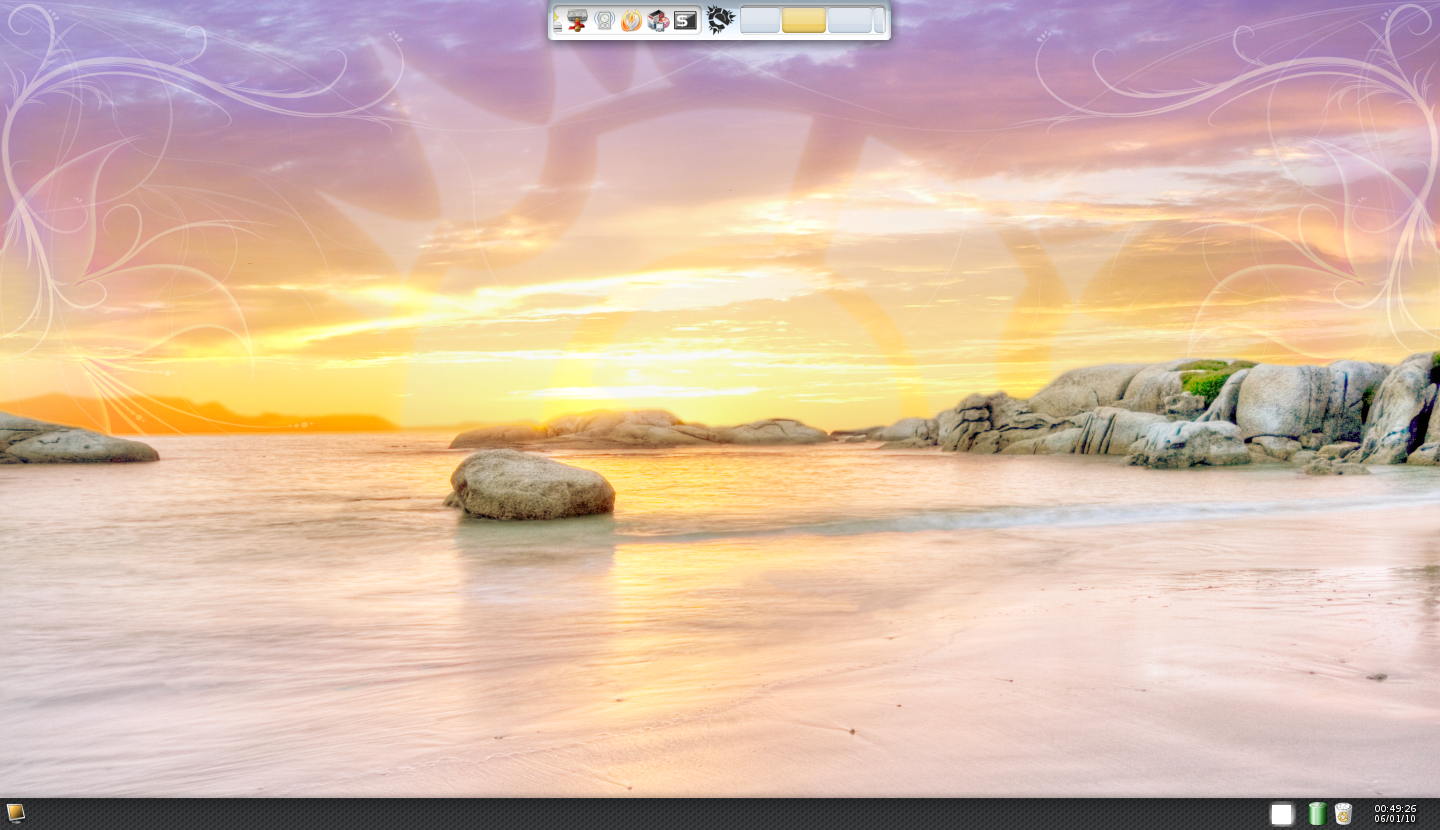
- An OpenGEU 9.10 Quarto di Luna Morning Sunshine screenshot
- Developer: Luca De Marini
- OS family: Linux (Unix-like)
- Working state: No longer active
- Source model: Open source
- Supported platforms: IA-32, x86-64
- Kernel type: Monolithic
- Default user interface: Enlightenment plus GNOME
- Official website: opengeu.intilinux.com

OpenGEU was a free computer operating system based upon the popular Ubuntu Linux distribution, which in turn is based on Debian. OpenGEU combined the strengths and ease of use of GNOME desktop environment with the lightweight, and graphical eye candy features of the Enlightenment window manager to create a unique and user-friendly desktop. While OpenGEU was originally derived from Ubuntu, the design of the interface gave it a significantly different appearance, with original art themes, software and tools.

== Geubuntu ==
Initially called Geubuntu (a mix of GNOME, Enlightenment and Ubuntu), OpenGEU was an unofficial re-working of Ubuntu. The name change from Geubuntu to OpenGEU occurred on 21 January 2008 in order to remove the "-buntu" suffix from its name. This was done in respect for Ubuntu's own trademark policies, which require all officially recognized Ubuntu derivatives to be based upon software found only in the official Ubuntu repositories–a criterion not met by OpenGEU.

== Installation ==
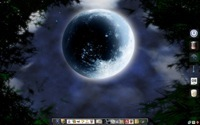
OpenGEU Luna Crescente Moonlight theme

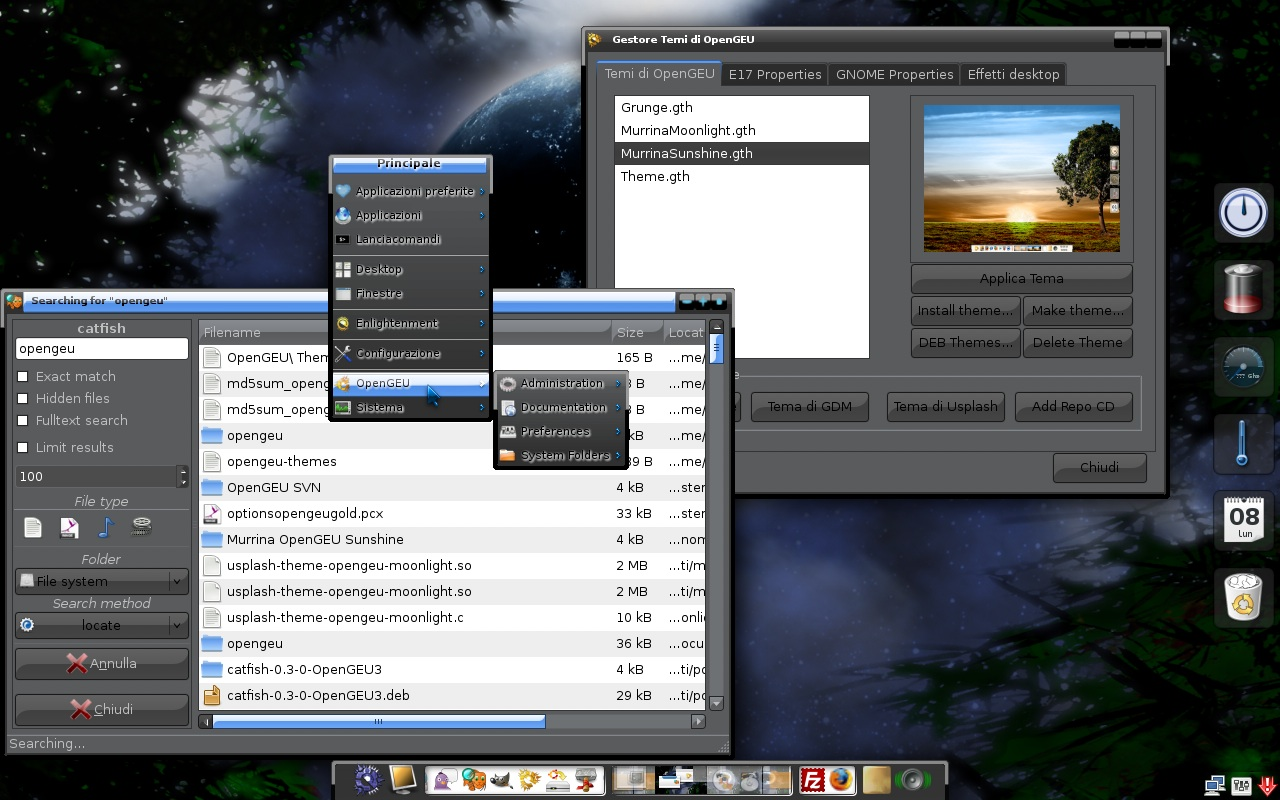
OpenGEU Luna Crescente Moonlight theme with a few windows open

Installation of OpenGEU was generally performed via a Live CD, which allowed the user to first test OpenGEU on their system prior to installation (albeit with a performance limit from loading applications off the disk). This is particularly useful for testing hardware compatibility and driver support. The CD also contained the Ubiquity installer, which guided the user through the permanent installation process. Due to the fact that OpenGEU used "Ubiquity," the installation process was nearly identical to that of Ubuntu. Alternatively, users could download a disk image of the CD from an online source which could then be written to a physical medium or run from a hard drive via UNetbootin. Another option was to add the OpenGEU repositories to an established Ubuntu-based system and install OpenGEU via the package manager.

== Programs ==
=== Default environment ===
As described above, OpenGEU includes software from both the GNOME and Enlightenment projects. Unlike Ubuntu, which uses Metacity or Compiz 3D, OpenGEU used Enlightenment DR17 as its primary window manager for its rich two-dimensional features, such as real transparency and desktop animation options. Starting with OpenGEU 8.10 Luna Serena, a port of Compiz called Ecomorph has been available for 3D effects, as well.

=== Themes manager ===
Starting with OpenGEU 8.04.1 Luna Crescente, the GEUTheme application became default in the distribution. This is a tool that displays a list of installed OpenGEU themes to the user, enabling the user to browse through them and select one with one-click ease. GEUTheme could fetch new themes from the internet or from an expansion CD for the user. The tool had some advanced customization abilities–it helping the user to install and customize many aspects of their OpenGEU desktop environment (including icon themes, GTK+, ETK, E17, EWL themes, wallpapers, fonts, etc.). It was also possible for the user to create new OpenGEU themes, as well as to export, import, and share them. The creation of this tool marked the first availability of a Desktop Effects Manager, similar to that of Ubuntu, for an Enlightenment desktop. This tool was incorporated into the GEUTheme application.

=== Additional components ===
Since the distribution was an Ubuntu derivative, the range of available software was almost identical to that of Ubuntu and the other related Ubuntu projects. Additional repositories were created by the OpenGEU development team, and were pre-enabled for the distribution's use. Enlightenment 17 software was compiled, re-packaged in the .deb packaging format, and uploaded to the repositories and a number of new software packages were developed by the OpenGEU team itself: the OpenGEU Themes Manager, eTray, e17-settings-daemon and several E17 modules.

== Themes ==
The E17 window manager used a number of different libraries to render GUI applications. To ensure every application shares the same look on the desktop, it was necessary to develop themes for various libraries that utilize the same art and graphics. This was a difficult and time-consuming task compared to that of GNOME, where all the GTK+ applications use the same default GTK+ libraries to render widgets. OpenGEU therefore developed a way to allow easy switching from one theme to another, and accordingly change the graphics of every desktop component at the same time. Every OpenGEU theme was also capable of changing the look of icon sets and wallpapers. In other words, OpenGEU themes were just a set of sub-themes for all of the different libraries used in the distribution (Edje, ETK, EWL, GTK+), designed so that the user would not notice any change in the appearance when opening their various chosen applications.

=== Sunshine and Moonlight ===
OpenGEU was presented as an artistic distribution. The two main signature themes of OpenGEU were Sunshine and Moonlight. While Sunshine and Moonlight are considered the primary themes, there were also a number of alternative themes available.

== Project focus ==
OpenGEU focused on reducing minimum hardware requirements, such as by providing two alternative methods to enable compositing effects without any particular hardware or driver requirement.

The primary OpenGEU concept was that of building a complete and universally accessible E17 desktop—filling all of the missing parts in E17 with GNOME tools, while maintaining the speed of the distribution–for usability on any system.

== Remixes ==
OpenGeeeU 8.10 Luna Serena was released March 23, 2009. It's a version of OpenGEU modified to work on the Asus EeePC. OpenGEU 8.10 uses EasyPeasy as its platform, so it is optimized for netbooks and it includes all of the drivers and fixes needed for EeePC to work out of the box.

== Release history ==
History of OpenGEU releases
| Version | Name | Release date | Description |
|---|---|---|---|
| 7.04 | Geubuntu Prima Luna | 18 September 2007 | The first version ever released. The main innovation of this distro was the idea of using a big number of system and configuration tools taken from the Gnome world, together with the Enlightenment Window Manager. Geubuntu 7.04 included GNOME Panel and Nautilus. |
| 7.10 | Geubuntu Luna Nuova | 6 December 2007 | The second GEUbuntu release came with brand new (and original) Sunshine and Moonlight themes and it focused much more than the first release on eye-candy and speed. It adopted Thunar instead of the Nautilus File Manager and Xfce 4 Panel instead of the GNOME Panel. |
| 7.10 | OpenGEU Luna Nuova | 21 January 2008 | This version was released shortly after the release of Geubuntu Luna Nuova and with this version Geubuntu changed its name to OpenGEU. Using the name change as an opportunity for releasing a new version, OpenGEU Luna Nuova is released and is a far more stable distribution, many bugs have been fixed. Another change was the use of FBPanel instead than Xfce Panel as the additional panel of the distribution. |
| 8.04 | OpenGEU Luna Crescente | 8 September 2008 | OpenGEU Luna Crescente is based on Ubuntu 8.04.1 (Hardy Heron). It introduced a lot of new software directly developed by the distribution team, like the OpenGEU Themes Manager (GEUTheme), an application called eTray (a system tray for Enlightenment, which lacked this kind of tool) some E17 modules like the Trash Bin (there was no trash bin whatsoever in Enlightenment before this) and Extramenu (a module that enables the user to add a custom menu, with submenus, to the standard E17 menu). With this release the OpenGEU team started compiling and managing their own repositories both for Enlightenment and the rest of the newly developed software. OpenGEU uses the default Ubuntu repositories too. With every OpenGEU release, new Sunshine and Moonlight themes have been developed and are used by default. With the release of GEUTheme, a lot more OpenGEU themes have been created and are available for download from the official repositories. |
| 8.10 | OpenGEU Luna Serena | 12 February 2009 | Luna Serena featured Ecomorph (modified Compiz for E17) - an optional compositing window manager for computers running 3D graphics cards, and a new settings manager and places menu. |
| 9.10 | OpenGEU Quarto di Luna | 27 January 2010 | This was the final release, although there were no means of downloading it directly. According to the release announcement, one can install Quarto di Luna via APT repositories into an existing Ubuntu 9.10 installation. |

Legend:
Unsupported
Supported
Latest version
Preview version
Future version

== The end ==
Despite announcing a switch to Debian as a base rather than Ubuntu a while after publishing Quarto di Luna in January 2010, a public release never came. As of August 2012 the Web site has been taken down along with their forums, mailing lists and other information, indicating that the project has disbanded.

== Reviews and citations ==
OpenGEU has been independently reviewed by a number of on- and off-line Linux magazines:

- Full Circle Magazine
- Softpedia
- Linux.com
- DistroWatch
- Dedoimedo.com

== See also ==
- Bodhi Linux
