= Gigabyte M912 =

Netbook by Gigabyte

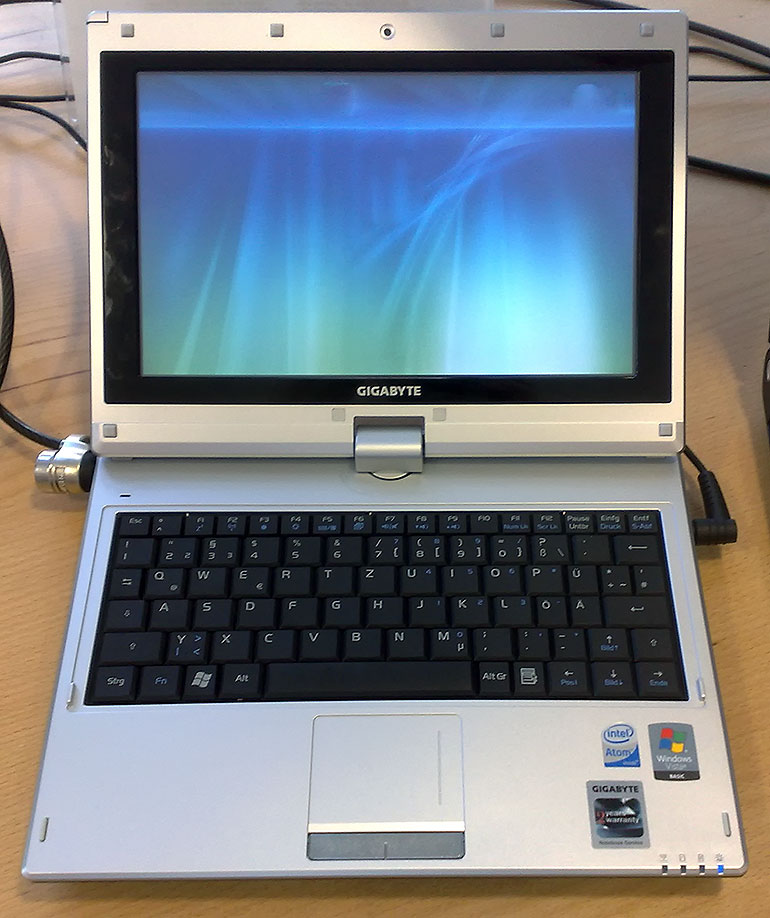
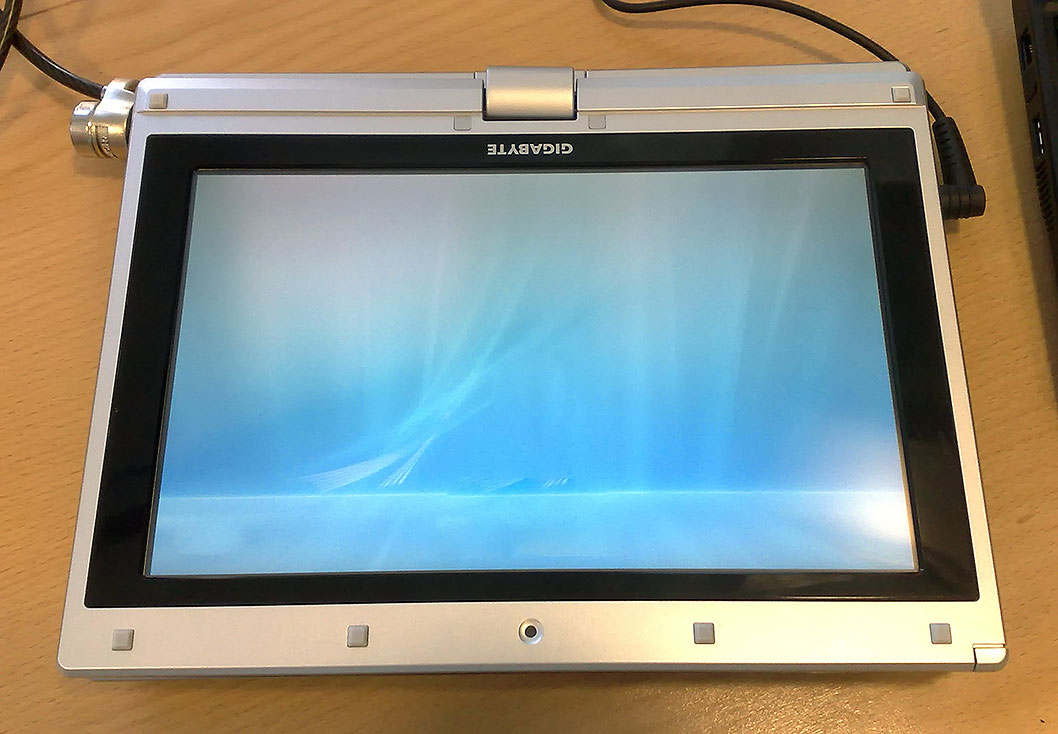
- M912V
- Manufacturer: Gigabyte Technology
- Type: Subnotebook/netbook
- Media: Secure Digital/MMC/Memory Stick/MS Pro
- Operating system: Linux, Windows XP, Windows Vista
- CPU: 1.6 GHz Intel Atom
- Memory: 1 GB DDR2 SDRAM RAM in a single SO-DIMM slot
- Storage: 4 GB SSD or 80–160 GB hard disk drive
- Display: 8.9 inch (diagonal) TFT LCD with LED and Resistive touchscreen Technonlogy (1024x600 / 1280x768)
- Input: Keyboard; Touchpad; Microphone
- Camera: 1.3 megapixel video camera
- Connectivity: 10/100 Mbit Ethernet; 802.11b/g wireless LAN; Bluetooth 3 USB 2.0 ports
- Power: 4 cell 4500
- Dimensions: 235 x 180 x 28~42 mm
- Weight: c. 1.3 kg
- Related: Asus EEE, MSI Wind

The first netbook offering by Gigabyte, the M912, is a hybrid netvertible Tablet PC device, was released in 2008. It features an Intel Atom processor and comes preloaded with either Windows XP, Windows Vista or a customised Linux distribution. The hardware varies slightly depending on the OS chosen. The Linux Version for example does not include Bluetooth and has a lower resolution screen. Press accounts suggest that there may be significant heat and speed issues compared with other netbooks. Other criticisms focus on Gigabyte's choice to ship one variant with Windows Vista Home Basic, which lacks official Tablet PC support and their refusal to ship it in the United States or Canada.

== Features and variations ==
Common features:

- 8.9" Touchscreen
  - Windows models:
    - CCFL backlit 1280x768 display
  - Linux models, and possibly M912T:
    - LED backlit 1024x600 display
- 2.5 Inch HDD Bay
- ExpressCard slot
- 4-in-1 card reader: Secure Digital/MMC/Memory Stick/MS Pro †
- 1 GB SO-DIMM
- 1.6 GHz Intel Atom
- Intel 945GSE Express Chipset+ICH7M

Variations include two models running Windows XP Home (M912X) and Windows Vista Home Basic (M912V) with a 160 GB hard drive and a screen resolution of 1280x768. The Ubuntu Linux version, M912M, is expected to ship with a 1024x600 screen resolution and 80 GB hard drive. Another, the M912S, is expected to ship with a 4 GB SSD. Another expected model, the M912T, is believed to have DVB-T support. While the Linux powered models are expected to ship with substantially lower screen-resolutions, their screens feature energy saving LED-backlights.

Good OS inc, has revealed that the Gigabyte M912 will be the first netbook to be offered with their "Cloud" instant on browser based operating system, that will add instant on internet access to the M912 touch screen netbook.

== See also ==
- Cloud (operating system)
- Netbook
- Comparison of netbooks
- Internet appliance
