= Gilles Samoun =

French businessman (born 1965)

Gilles Samoun (born 1965) is a French investor, tech serial entrepreneur in the Silicon Valley and France, pioneer and strong advocate of software as a service (SaaS) since he founded Qualys in early 1999, the cybersecurity leader which subsequently went public, listed on NASDAQ, in 2012. He is the founder and CEO of Salesmachine, a Customer Success Management platform which helps SaaS companies increase conversion and adoption and prevent churn. The Salesmachine platform connects with SaaS products and provides product-led teams with the necessary insights and tools to engage with the right product at the right time with the right context.

He holds a master's degree in Computer Science and Artificial Intelligence from the University of Paris.

In 2001 he was honored with the position of Entrepreneur in Residence at Benchmark Capital, now Balderton, one of Europe’s leading technology venture firms.

Committed to the French Tech, Gilles Samoun has invested in French startups Algolia, Payfit, Spendesk, Agricool, Shine over the last 10 years and was listed among the top seven French tech business angels in Sifted 2021 report "The French tech revolution".

He is also a board member of numerous tech companies CipherCloud, Jolicloud, Abiquo, including French unicorn Criteo from 2007 to 2011, where is known for being behind Criteo’s revolutionary business model.

Prior to Salesmachine, Gilles Samoun has been the CEO of NTRGlobal, a SaaS company founded in Barcelona, Spain, Fotopedia, Solsoft between 2003 and 2006, Qualys, and MediaPath Technologies Inc.
