= Ubuntu Netbook Edition =

Netbook Linux distribution

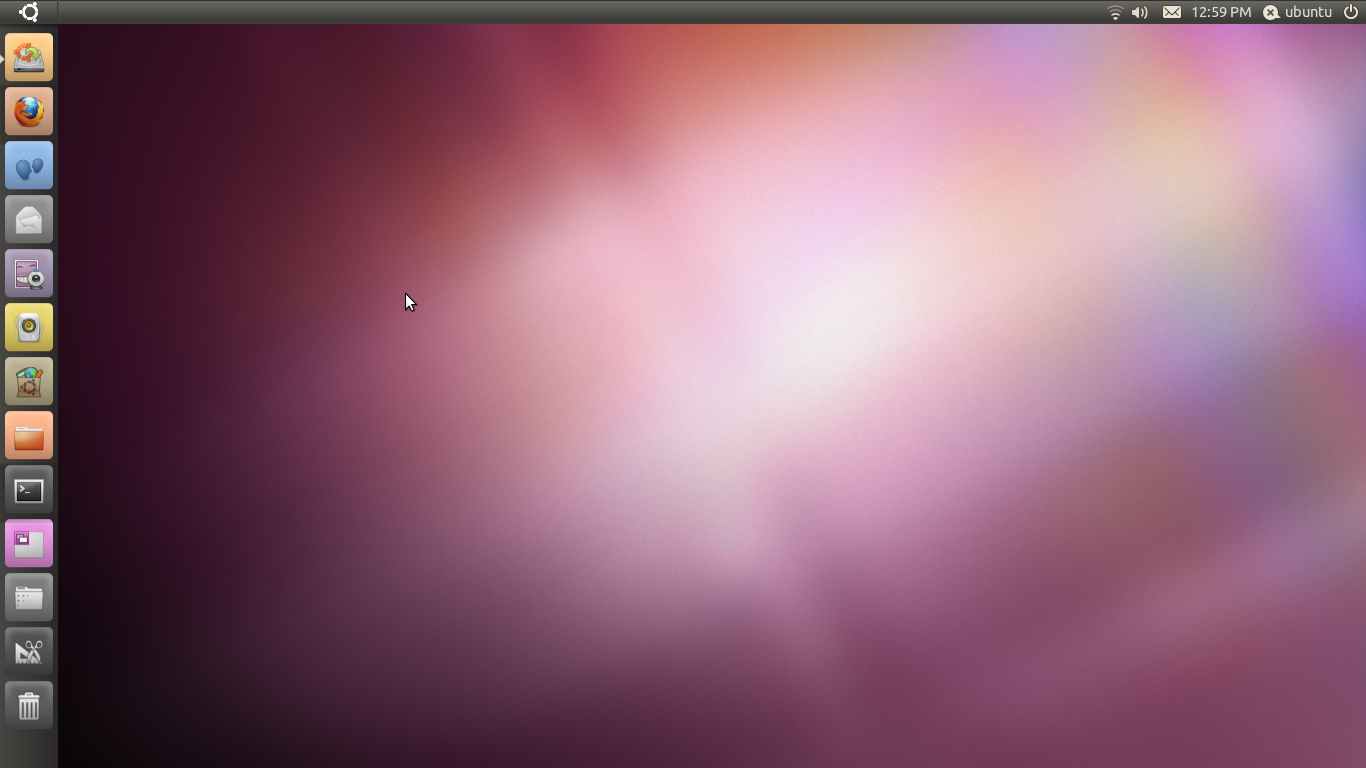
- Ubuntu 10.10 (Maverick Meerkat) Netbook Edition
- Developer: Canonical Ltd. / Ubuntu Foundation
- OS family: Linux (Unix-like)
- Working state: Merged into desktop edition from Ubuntu 11.04. End of life as a separate OS.
- Source model: Open source
- Latest release: 10.10 / October 10, 2010
- Available in: Multilingual
- Update method: APT (front-ends available)
- Package manager: dpkg (front-ends like Synaptic available)
- Supported platforms: IA-32
- Kernel type: Monolithic (Linux)
- Default user interface: GNOME + Unity
- License: Free software licenses (mainly GPL) / Various others
- Official website: www.canonical.com/projects/ubuntu/unr

Ubuntu Netbook Edition (UNE), known as Ubuntu Netbook Remix (UNR) prior to the release of Ubuntu 10.04, is a discontinued version of the Ubuntu operating system (OS) that has been optimized to enable it to work better on netbooks and other devices with small screens or with the Intel Atom CPU.

UNE was available starting with Ubuntu release 8.04 ("Hardy Heron"). UNE was also an optional preinstalled operating system on some netbooks, such as Dell Inspiron Mini 10v and the Toshiba NB100, and also ran on popular models such as the Acer Aspire One and the Asus Eee PC.

Canonical Ltd., the developers of Ubuntu, collaborated with the Moblin project to ensure optimization for lower hardware requirements and longer battery life.

Beginning with version 10.10, Ubuntu Netbook Edition used the Unity desktop as its desktop interface. The classic netbook interface was available in Ubuntu's software repositories as an option.

Because Ubuntu's desktop edition has moved to the same Unity interface as the netbook edition, starting with Ubuntu 11.04, the netbook edition was merged into the desktop edition.

== Installation ==
UNE could be installed in several ways:

- by first installing the regular Ubuntu package, then adding the UNE repository, and installing the relevant packages. Starting with Ubuntu 10.04, the packages were available on main repositories.
- by downloading UNE directly from the Ubuntu server, as either a .iso or .img file, and writing the file to a USB stick (using Ubuntu Live USB Creator or UNetbootin) or CD.
- an option to install via the Wubi installer was available for the Ubuntu 10.04 "Lucid Lynx" and Ubuntu 10.10 "Maverick Meerkat" release.

== Unity ==
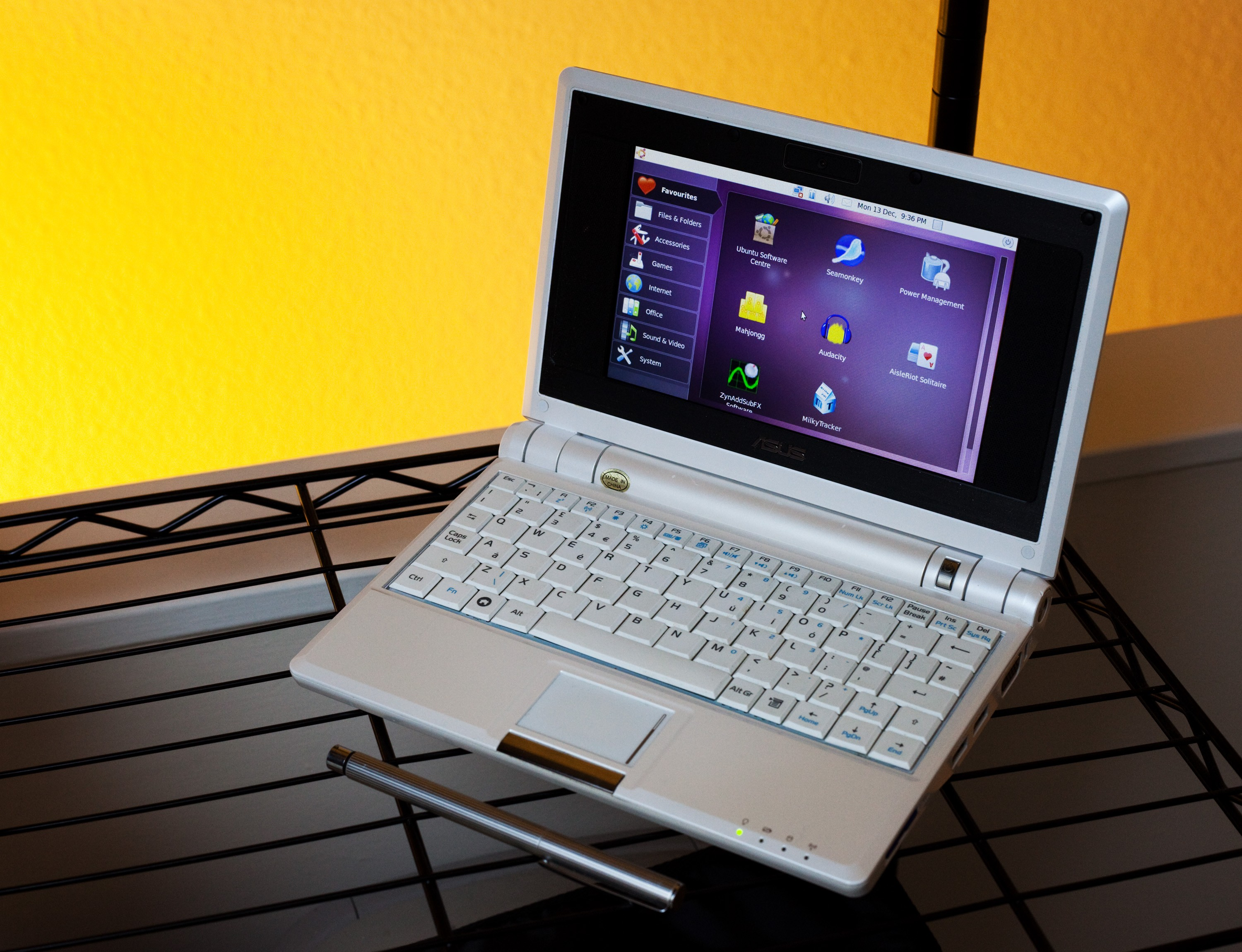
UNE 10.10 running on an Asus Eee netbook

Starting with UNE 10.10, the interface was switched to Unity. Due to the desktop version of Ubuntu also being changed to the Unity interface, the netbook edition was rolled into the general Ubuntu distribution starting with Ubuntu 11.04 Natty Narwhal and the netbook edition was discontinued as a separate distribution.

== Variants ==
Dell Ubuntu Netbook Edition is built specifically for the hardware profile of the Inspiron Mini 9, and is also available for the Inspiron Mini 12. It includes a custom built interface and launcher as well as non-free codecs such as MPEG-4 and MP3. It began shipping on September 22, 2008.

EasyPeasy is considered to be among the first UNE-based distributions, with a focus on the usage of proprietary software like Skype by default and also integrating a set of different standard applications and drivers.

== Support ==
The minimum requirements are an Intel Atom CPU of at least 1.6 GHz, 512MB RAM and 4GB storage.

Ubuntu Netbook Edition was officially shipped with the following netbooks:

- Sylvania G Netbook Meso
- Toshiba NB100
- System76 Starling Netbook
- Dell Mini10v, Mini10, Latitude 2100 & Latitude 2110
- Advent 4211C
- Samsung N110
- ZaReason Terra HD netbook and other ZaReason laptop models

== See also ==
- Comparison of netbook-oriented Linux distributions
- EasyPeasy
- Eeebuntu
- Joli OS
- Leeenux Linux
- Ubuntu for Android
- Ubuntu Phone
