= OpenedHand =

OpenedHand, a computer software, was an embedded Linux start-up that was acquired by Intel in Q3, 2008. The firm developed an OpenEmbedded distribution called Poky Linux (now part of the Yocto Project) and the Clutter library. The latter is heavily used in the customized UIs of Maemo and Moblin, embedded Linux distributions from Nokia and Intel, respectively.
