= Samsung N130 =

Subnotebook/netbook computer by Samsung

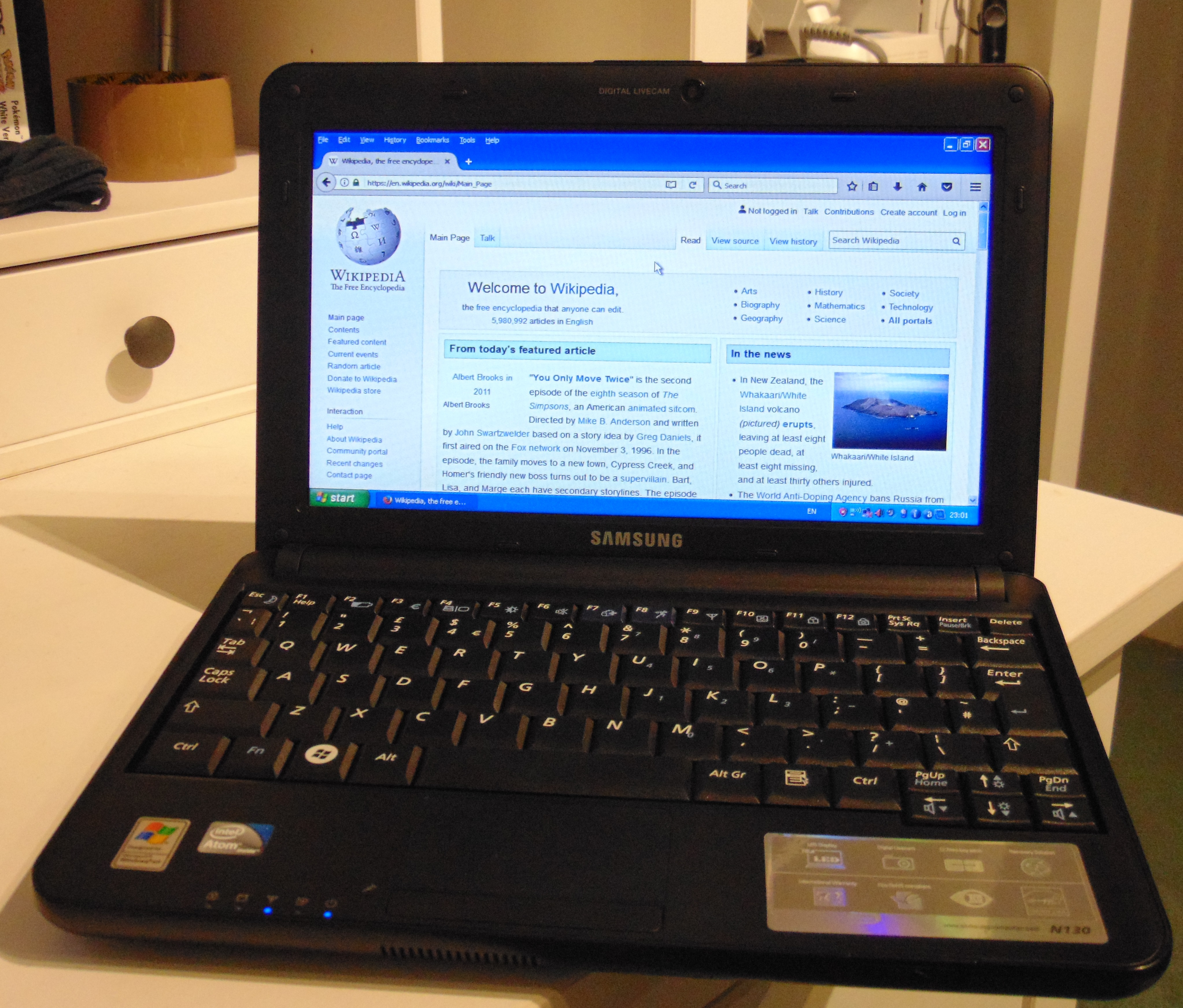
- A Samsung N130 running Windows XP Home Edition
- Developer: Samsung
- Type: Subnotebook/Netbook
- Media: 160 GB 2.5" 5400 rpm SATA HDD
- Operating system: Windows XP or Windows 7
- CPU: 1.6 GHz Intel Atom N270
- Memory: 1 GB 200-pin PC2-6400 800MHz DDR2 SDRAM
- Display: 10.1" (25.7 cm) 1024×600 LED-backlit TFT LCD
- Input: Keyboard (91% full size); Touchpad
- Camera: 1.3 megapixel Webcam built-in
- Connectivity: 10/100 Mbit Ethernet; 802.11b/g wireless LAN; 3 USB 2.0 ports 3-in-1 Flash Memory card reader (SD, SDHC, MMC)
- Power: 7.5 hours of battery life with standard 6-cell battery
- Dimensions: 26.38 × 18.55 × 2.85 cm
- Weight: 1.25 kg (2.6 lb) (including battery)

The Samsung N130 (Samsung SENS N130 in South Korea) is a subnotebook/netbook computer designed by Samsung. At the time of its introduction, it was noted for a good keyboard, large 6-cell battery as standard, giving a battery life of up to 7.5 hours a medium 160gb SATA hard disk drive and a release price of 349 USD.

== Technical overview ==
=== Processor and memory ===
The Samsung N130 uses a 1.6 GHz Intel Atom N270 processor. The N130 has 1 GB of 200-pin PC2-6400 800MHz DDR2 SDRAM memory as standard. Internally, the N130 has one slot for memory accepting SO-DIMM memory modules up to 2 GB.

=== Display ===
The screen is a non-glossy LED backlit display and measures 10.1 inches diagonally, and has a resolution of 1024×600 pixels. An external VGA out is also included.

=== Keyboard ===
As with earlier models, the 83-key keyboard is 93% of the size of a full-size keyboard, which makes typing quite easy on the netbook. The keyboard is made with Silver Nano (Anti-Bacterial) technology.

=== Storage ===
The standard internal hard drive size is 160 GB. It also includes an SD card slot, supporting MMC, SD and SDHC cards for additional storage as a standard features of this netbook series.

== Operating systems ==
The N130 is shipped either with Windows XP Home Edition, Windows Vista Business or Windows 7 Starter. Linux (e.g. Ubuntu, Mandriva) distributions are also supported.

== Colors and configurations ==
The N130 is available in different colors and configurations. Colors include white, black, blue and pink. The configurations may differ in the lack of Bluetooth, e.g. some models in German markets, the fitting of a UMTS/HSDPA module, a weaker battery.

The new model N140 is an upgrade of the basic N130 design, with modified touchpad, Bluetooth 2.0+EDR (standard configuration) and improved styling.

== Criticism ==
Some users noticed a keyboard typing problem because the placement of the Page up, Backspace and Page down keys was considered troublesome.

== See also ==
- Comparison of netbooks
