= Joli OS =

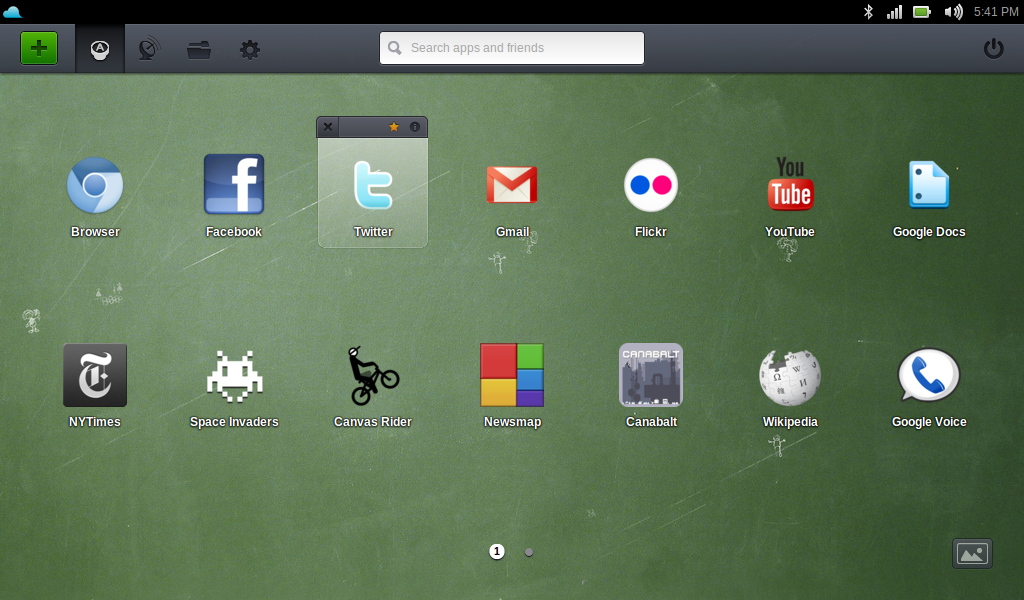
- Joli OS screenshot
- Developer: Jolicloud
- OS family: Linux (Unix-like)
- Working state: discontinued
- Source model: Open source
- Initial release: July 2010; 16 years ago
- Final release: 1.2 / 9 March 2011; 15 years ago
- Update method: Jolicloud Desktop with automatic downloads in background
- Supported platforms: x86
- License: various
- Official website: www.jolicloud.com

Joli OS is a discontinued Ubuntu-based Linux distribution created by Tariq Krim and Romain Huet, co-founders of the French company Jolicloud (which was also the name of the operating system until version 1.2). Joli OS is a free and open-source software project, with source code hosted on GitHub.

On 22 November 2013, Tariq Krim decided to discontinue Joli OS, but keep the source code open.

Jolicloud was discontinued on 1 April 2016.

== History ==
The project was launched in 2008 by Netvibes founder Tariq Krim and Romain Huet. Krim originally wanted to build a laptop using environmentally friendly manufacturing methods, but the two co-founders refocused the effort on building an operating system. Venture capital firms Atomico Ventures and Mangrove Capital Partners provided $4.2 million in funding.

Version 1.0 was released in July 2010 and version 1.1 was released on 7 December 2010. Version 1.2 was released on 9 March 2011.

== Design, hardware compatibility ==
Joli OS was at the start built on Ubuntu Netbook Edition, and as with that Linux distribution, was tweaked for netbooks and other computers with limited disk storage, memory, and screen size. Later Joli OS is built on Ubuntu with a customized kernel.

Joli OS was designed for easy installation, with Wi-Fi, bluetooth, and 3G modem support all included. The operating system supports all the major netbooks, including models from Asus, Acer, Dell, HP, MSI, Samsung, and Sony. Jolicloud claimed the OS supports 98% of netbooks with out-of-the-box compatibility but also worked on a very large number of other devices, up to 10 years old: laptops, desktops and tablets.

Version 1.0 of the operating system incorporates a user interface built mainly with HTML5 that includes an application launcher, a library of compatible applications with one-click installation and removal, a display of all machines associated with a user account, and a social activity stream that enables users to compare installed applications. The launcher displays only those applications supported in the library, but the identical configuration can be viewed from any machine running Joli OS. Account management is available from any computer with an HTML5-compatible browser. Jolicloud's HTML5 implementation is through the Chromium web browser, which serves as middleware for Web rendering.

== Version 1.0 reviews, response ==
Reviewers evaluating Joli OS differed in their appraisals, depending on whether they were writing for a user who is new to Linux or is more experienced with the operating system. Writing on a Condé Nast Traveler blog, Mike Haney called Joli OS "an easy, free OS that you don't have to be a code-monkey to install and does everything you need your netbook to do, quickly. I put it on a Lenovo netbook this weekend that was running like molasses under Windows 7, and I'm a convert". While Joli OS is not the first operating system designed from Linux targeted at the beginning netbooks, "it's the first that doesn't feel like you're using Linux: no funky install procedures, no code, no accessing special directories to find more apps." He compared Joli OS in look and function to iOS, the operating system used by the Apple iPad (as well as the iPhone and iPod Touch), though with the folders and files of a conventional computer".

In Computerworld, Serdar Yegulalp wrote that Joli OS 1.0 "feels like a second beta, not a 1.0 release; it needs more work before it's truly useful instead of one step above a curiosity". Yegulalp reported problems launching some applications, including the Google Chrome browser and the VLC media player, an inability to do peer-to-peer mesh networking, the power button getting blocked by open windows, and no hibernation mode, even if the computer supports it. He noted comparable performance with Windows 7 but slightly faster boot times. But ZDNet reporter David Meyer disagreed with that performance assessment after running Jolicloud on a Nokia Booklet 3G in order to take advantage of that device's unusual 720p screen resolution. He wrote that the device's "lousy Atom Z530 processor...really struggles under Windows 7 Starter Edition [but] flies on Jolicloud....I'm struggling to think of a rival Linux distro that can be so easily picked up and run by an average user".

In Ars Technica, Ryan Paul wrote that "there are a lot of good ideas on display in Jolicloud [now Joli OS] 1.0, but the nascent product still feels incomplete". He saw no reason for Linux users, particularly Ubuntu users, to switch. "Ubuntu's own Unity environment is more sophisticated and has much better integration between native applications and the underlying platform," though Joli OS might be a better choice for users interested in Web applications. Noting that Joli OS 1.0's foundation is Ubuntu 9.04, which is nearing the end of its support cycle by Canonical, Paul wrote that "the real challenge will be continuing to expand the scope of Joli OS's differentiating features while...ensuring that Jolicloud users will benefit from Ubuntu's steady stream of new features."

Tariq Krim defended the decision to stay with Ubuntu 9.04 in Joli OS 1.0, arguing that later Ubuntu versions have been less stable and have required user-initiated software installations to be fully functional. Examples where Jolicloud developers did additional work to ensure out-of-the-box functionality include support for Poulsbo GMA500 drivers, touchscreens and 3G. He said the company was "moving away from Ubuntu to a solution that could fit our user needs better. We are looking closely at what Chrome OS is doing".

== Jolibook ==
In November 2010, Jolicloud shipped a netbook computer, called Jolibook, that ran the operating system out of the box. The computer was manufactured by UK-based Vye Computers and featured a 10.1-inch screen, dual core 1.5 GHz Intel Atom N550, 1 GB RAM and a 250 GB hard drive. Artwork on the lid included the slogan "fast, fun, connected". The machine was only available in the United Kingdom, selling for £280 via Shop.VyePC.com and Amazon.co.uk, and is no longer manufactured.

== Version 1.1 ==
Jolicloud released version 1.1 in December 2010. The new version was based on Ubuntu 10.04 LTS (Lucid), with future patches planned from 10.10 (Maverick). Among the improvements claimed by the company were faster boot times of 10–20 seconds on most devices tested, 15 percent battery life improvements (tested on a Clevo M1100 netbook with an Intel Atom N450 processor and a three-cell battery) and support for all PCs, not just netbooks.

== Version 1.2 ==
Version 1.2 was announced in March 2011 and renamed Joli OS. The new version featured a new boot screen, auto and guest mode log-ins, a local file system integrated within the desktop, remote access to the desktop from any HTML5-capable browser, optional background updates, and support for the latest Chromium 10 browser and Flash 10.2. Version 1.2 also includes Dropbox integration, an app creation wizard, and a file browser to access local files, preview Dropbox files and edit using Google Docs. It uses 2.2 GB of disk space when installed.

== See also ==
- SUSE Studio#Notable appliances
- List of Linux distributions#openSUSE-based
- Cloud (operating system)
- Comparison of netbook-oriented Linux distributions
- EasyPeasy
- ChromeOS
- MeeGo
