= CipherCloud =

Cloud security software company

- Type: Private
- Industry: Information privacy
- Founded: (2010)
- Founder: Pravin Kothari
- Headquarters: San Jose, California, United States
- Key people: Pravin Kothari, Founder & CEO; John M. Jack, Board; Gilles Samoun, Board
- Website: www.ciphercloud.com

CipherCloud was an American software company providing cloud computing security to businesses. The company was established in 2010 and is based out of San Jose, California. It was bought by Lookout in 2021.

== History ==
CipherCloud was founded in 2010 by Pravin Kothari, who previously co-founded ArcSight. The company launched in February 2011 and initially worked in Salesforce.com environments. It added Amazon Web Services integration in 2011. CipherCloud released its Gmail security service in June 2012. By September 2012, CipherCloud's platform could secure Force.com, Chatter, Microsoft Office 365. It also launched Connect AnyApp, which allowed users to specify Web pages of an application to be secured.

CipherCloud closed a $30 million funding round led by Andreessen Horowitz and Index Ventures in December 2012. Deutsche Telekom also participated in the funding round through T-Ventures, the telecommunications company's venture capital arm. John M. Jack, a partner at Andreessen Horowitz and former CEO of Fortify Software, joined the CipherCloud board following the investment. The company opened its European headquarters in London, England in the same month. CipherCloud added an Australian headquarters in 2013.

In February 2013, CipherCloud joined Box Inc., an online file sharing and cloud-content management service, to bring CipherCloud's security to file-sharing and file-hosting services such as Box. In January 2014, CipherCloud acquired CloudUp Networks. CloudUp Networks' software was in the area of tracking and authorized data management in the cloud environments.

In April 2014, CipherCloud released a new product, CipherCloud for Cloud Discovery. Cloud Discovery was built to analyze firewall and proxy logs of cloud applications in use (Shadow IT), as well as evaluate the risks those applications might represent to the organization.

In November 2014, the company announced closing its Series B funding round of $50 million. Transamerica Ventures led the round, joined by Delta Partners, and existing investors Andreessen Horowitz and T-Ventures, the venture capital arm of Deutsche Telekom.

In March 2021, CipherCloud was acquired by Lookout.

In May 2025, Lookout sold the assets of the Cloud Security line of business based on CipherCloud technologies to Fortra.

== Technology ==
According to Gartner's reviews, CipherCloud's CASB+ platform shares the features similar to other major cloud services providers: data protection, adaptive access control, threat protection and centralized compliance capabilities across different SaaS and IaaS clouds.
