= Fuduntu =

Fuduntu Linux

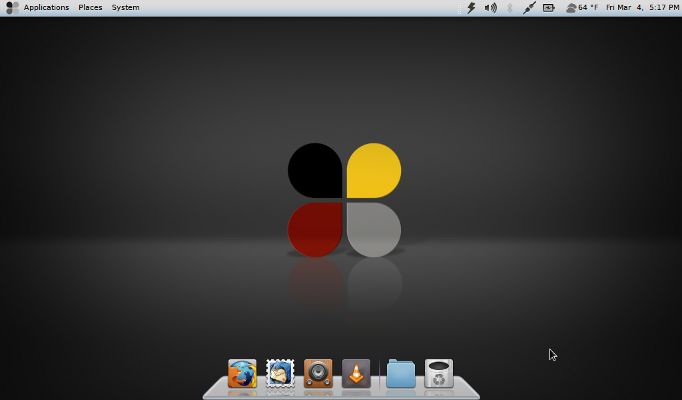
- Screenshot A sample Fuduntu Linux desktop
- OS family: Linux (Unix-like)
- Working state: Discontinued
- Source model: Mainly Open source and closed source
- Initial release: November 7, 2010; 15 years ago
- Latest release: 2013.2 / 8 April 2013; 13 years ago
- Marketing target: General purpose; optimized for portable computers
- Update method: Yum (PackageKit)
- Package manager: RPM Package Manager
- Supported platforms: IA-32, x86-64
- Kernel type: Monolithic (Linux)
- Default user interface: GNOME
- License: Mainly GNU GPL; various other free software licenses. For ease of use, some proprietary items are also included (e.g., Adobe Flash).
- Official website: www.fuduntu.org

Fuduntu Linux was a Fedora-based Linux distribution created by Andrew Wyatt. It was actively developed between 2010 and 2013. It was designed to fit in somewhere between Fedora and Ubuntu. It was notable for providing a 'classic' desktop experience. Although it was optimized for netbooks and other portable computers, it is still a general-purpose OS.

== History ==
After forking Fedora 14 in early November 2011, Fuduntu became an independent distribution and was no longer considered a "remix" of Fedora, it did not qualify as a "spin" because it contained packages not included in Fedora.

On a Team Meeting held on 14 April 2013, it was decided that Fuduntu would discontinue development and no new versions will be released. Large parts of the team were planning to work on a new rebased OS. The move of wider support to GTK 3 and Systemd were also factors, as Fuduntu used GTK 2 and wasn't systemd based.

=== Post development ===
On 28 April 2013 the Fuduntu website officially informed that the project has come to an end and that users may want to switch to the new project Cloverleaf Linux which is based on openSUSE instead.

In late August, the development team decided to discontinue Cloverleaf, due to lack of manpower. Other concerns included image leaks and other issues regarding source code for KDE's upcoming lightweight desktop environment KLyDE, which in term was supposed to be used as Cloverleaf's default desktop environment.

== Features ==
As Fuduntu was originally targeted at the Asus Eee PC and other netbooks it contained tweaks to reduce power consumption. This included moving the /tmp and /var/log directories to a RAM disk, and reducing swappiness 10, to reduce the frequency of disk spin-up. Also, Fuduntu includes the Jupiter power management applet (also developed by Andrew Wyatt), for easy adjustment of CPU performance settings, screen output and resolution, etc.

The default packages include Nautilus Elementary, Adobe Flash, the Fluendo MP3 Codec, VLC, Infinality Freetype, LibreOffice, and the nano editor.

=== Look and Feel ===
The used icon theme is called Faenza Cupertino. It features the distinctive square icon set of Faenza. Because it was originally based on Fedora and Ubuntu it has GNOME as window manager, giving the opportunity to change themes, including window frames.

It aimed for a 'classic' desktop experience, as opposed to a 'mobile' experience.

== See also ==
- Ubuntu GNOME
