= Philippe Courtot =

French-American entrepreneur (1945–2021)

Philippe F. Courtot
- Born: 26 August 1944; France
- Died: 5 June 2021 (aged 76)
- Occupations: Chairman and CEO of Qualys

Philippe Courtot (English: /kʊərˈtoʊ/ koor-TOH, French: [filip kuʁto]; 26 August 1944 – 5 June 2021) was a French-American serial entrepreneur and business executive. Courtot was the chairman and CEO of Qualys, Nasdaq: QLYS a cloud security company based in California. He headed the sales of three companies and led two others to their initial public offerings. Courtot was a five-time CEO who previously worked with companies such as Signio and Verity. In 2012, Courtot launched the Trustworthy Internet Movement, an initiative to integrate security measures into the product-making process. In 2014, Courtot was included on Business Insider's list of the Most Powerful Person In Tech at Every Age.

== Early life and education ==
Philippe Courtot was born in France in 1944 during the end of the WWII German occupation. His mother, an immigrant from Spain, was a Spanish teacher, while his father was a lawyer. Courtot was raised Catholic and attended Jesuit schools in his youth.

Courtot attended the University of Paris and earned a master's degree in Physics before immigrating to the United States in 1981.

== Career ==
Courtot was previously the president and CEO of Thomson-CGR (Companie Générale de Radiologie) a Medical Corporation, which at the time was an affiliate of one of the world's largest medical-imaging companies. In 1987, Courtot won the Benjamin Franklin Award for his efforts in creating a nationwide campaign advocating for awareness of the benefits of early detection of breast cancer through mammography.

In 1988, Courtot joined a LAN-based email company called cc:Mail as president after reading an ad in the Wall Street Journal for the position. In 1990, Microsoft offered to buy cc:Mail for $12 million. Courtot turned down the offer and sold the company for $55 million in 1991 to Lotus.

After selling cc:Mail, Courtot was later named president and CEO of Verity in 1993, an intellectual capital management and software company. He led the company to its initial public offering in 1995 and then stepped down from his positions at Verity in 1997.

Courtot was appointed chairman and CEO of Signio, an electronic payment company that Courtot re-positioned to be a large secure payment provider in the e-commerce industry in 1999. In 2000, Courtot led the company through an acquisition by VeriSign, an internet security company that purchased Signio for $1.3 billion.

Courtot had begun investing in Qualys, a cloud security company, back in 1999, but was named CEO in 2001 after he had left Signio. In 2004, SC Magazine awarded Courtot the Editor's Award for his efforts in the network security industry and for founding CSO Interchange, a forum that allows users to share information in the security industry. In 2011, SC Magazine named him as CEO of the Year at their European awards ceremony. Courtot led Qualys to its initial public offering in 2012, and remained CEO until March 2021, when he stepped down for health reasons. He died a few months thereafter.

== Other activities ==
Courtot volunteered with and served on the board of trustees for The Internet Society, an international non-profit organization.
