= EasyPeasy =

Linux-based operating system for netbooks

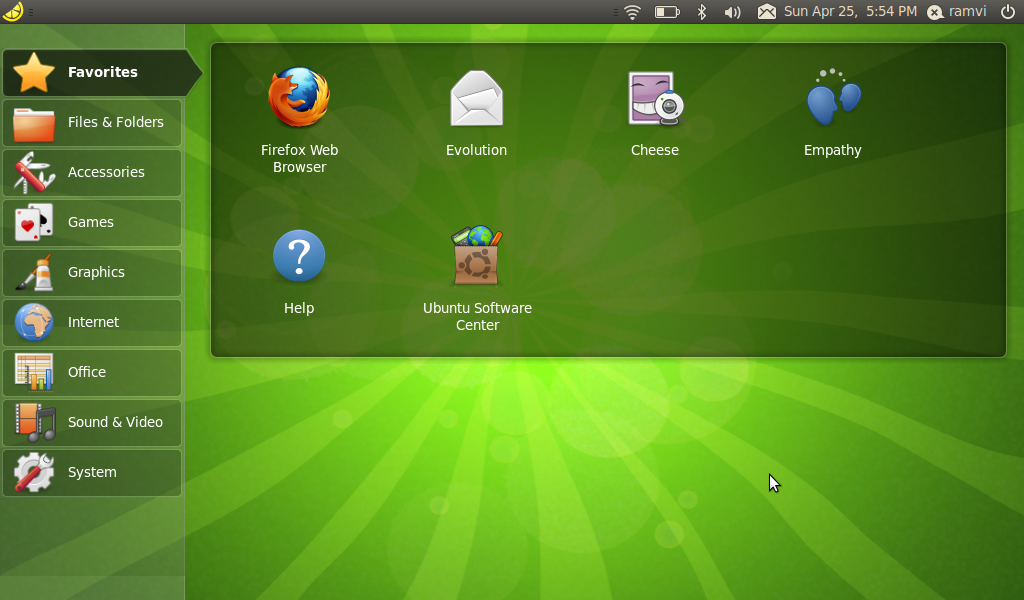
- EasyPeasy 1.6
- Developer: EasyPeasy community
- OS family: Unix-like (Linux kernel)
- Working state: Discontinued
- Source model: Open source
- Initial release: July 4, 2008
- Latest release: 1.6 / April 26, 2010
- Latest preview: 2.0 alpha / March 5, 2012
- Update method: APT (front-ends available)
- Package manager: dpkg
- Default user interface: GNOME + Ubuntu Netbook Edition
- Official website: http://www.geteasypeasy.com

EasyPeasy (formerly named Ubuntu Eee) was a Linux-based operating system for netbooks. EasyPeasy was built upon Debian and Ubuntu, but was customized for low-powered computers and access to web applications. EasyPeasy is maintained as an open source project, though it primarily uses popular web applications or proprietary software over free and open source software alternatives (e.g. Skype over Ekiga) when the functionality offered is deemed better by its users.

== Main characteristics ==
- Uses a recent Ubuntu release as a base
- Supports many netbooks
- Pre-installs some widely used applications and codecs like Adobe Flash and MP3
- Uses well known proprietary software, instead of open source alternatives
- Strives to deliver netbook functionality like the Social Desktop and automatic file synchronization

== History ==
Ubuntu Eee was started by Jon Ramvi in December 2007. At that time it was only some scripts which modified a regular Ubuntu installation to support the Asus Eee PCs. In June 2008 the project was disbanded as a script and Ubuntu Eee 8.04 was released as a stand-alone distribution, based on Ubuntu 8.04 with EeePC support installed out of the box. On September 5 followed the 8.04.1 version. It used a new Linux kernel, came with a new user interface and Flash 10.

It was renamed EasyPeasy in January 2009, and has been downloaded well over two million times from the main mirror.

=== Trademark issues ===
On September 10, 2008, Canonical notified Jon Ramvi by email that the project's use of Canonical's names, URLs, and logos violated Canonical's trademarks in the original name Ubuntu Eee. In response, the owners of the project announced that they would use a new name EasyPeasy and version 1.0 was released January 1, 2009.

== Release history ==
| Release | Release date |
|---|---|
| Ubuntu Eee 8.04 | 2008-06-16 |
| EasyPeasy 1.0 | 2009-01-01 |
| EasyPeasy 1.1 | 2009-04-20 |
| EasyPeasy 1.5 | 2009-09-08 |
| EasyPeasy 1.6 | 2010-05-03 |
| EasyPeasy 2.0 alpha | 2012-03-05 |

== See also ==
- Comparison of netbook-oriented Linux distributions
- Ubuntu Netbook Edition
