= Paul C. Kim =

Marketing director

Paul C. Kim is the Director of Marketing for Everex (a subsidiary of First International Computer Global of Taiwan, TSE 3701 ) a supplier of personal computers, notebooks and ultra-mobile PCs. Mr. Kim currently serves as the developer and lead visionary for Everex marketing. Known for developing unique and innovative PC products, his responsibilities include managing the daily and long-term promotional, and positioning strategies for the 25-year-old American PC company based in Fremont, California .

In the summer of 2007, under the guidance of Kim, Everex partnered with OpenOffice.org to release the first Windows Vista-based PC with a pre-installed open source productivity suite. Targeting students and back-to-school shoppers, Wal-Mart stores throughout the US carried the computer.

From the success of using Linux on a mainstream computer, Kim worked with David Liu of Faqly.com to create a $198 PC running an Ubuntu-based OS and featuring open source software from companies such as Google and Mozilla. The desktop, which sold out over 10,000 units during the Christmas season, also featured a processor made by VIA Technologies. The two companies had previously collaborated to release an energy-efficient laptop loaded with Windows.

Showing further commitment to Linux and Open Source, in February 2008, Kim launched a 7" ultra-mobile notebook dubbed "CloudBook",. Stating ". "...we're not trying to be all things to all people.", the CloudBook promised consumers extreme light-weight and portability but made use of a hard disk drive rather than solid state drive. The device was similar to competitor EeePC. Kim plans to launch additional versions with larger screen sizes and keyboards in the future.

A product built especially for MySpace users, Kim again teamed with the gOS (operating system) to create the gPC mini (aka. MyMiniPC) in April, 2008. Designed on an Intel Pentium Dual-Core mobile processor, the 2-inch PC ran gOS Space and featured OpenOffice.org as well as links to YouTube, Gmail and Wikipedia. Similar in appearance to the Mac mini, the specifications of gPC mini allowed it to run as a media machine.

In early, 2008, Everex was named "Linux Magazine's Top 20 Companies to Watch in 2008".

== Sources ==
- Patrizio, Andy (2007-10-31), Everex PC Goes Linux, Low-Cost. Internetnews.com
- Benderoff, Eric (2007-11-01) $199 computer could crack 'digital divide'. ChicagoTribune.com
- Shah, Agam (2007-11-05), Everex to launch Linux notebooks under $300 next year. ComputerWorld.com
- Farber, Dan (2007-11-27), Google-friendly PC by Everex for $198 (No Microsoft Software). SeekingAlpha.com
- Beschizza, Rob (January 3, 2008). "$200 Desktop PC Gets OS Update: Here's 7 Uses For This Little Wonder". Blog.Wired.com. Wired.
- Stromberg, Bjorn (2008-01-17) 7" CloudBook this month. 9" CloudBook this summer. UltraMobileLife.com
- Mathis, Blair (2008-01-25) Everex Delays Cloudbook Shipping Due to Software Issues Laptoplogic.com
- Kwan, Michael (2008-02-07), 22-Inch Everex CloudBook "Sub" Notebook in the Works. MobileMag.com
- Malik Haroon (2008-02-08), Everex Cloudbook to Get Touchscreen Display. Gizmodo.com
- Sellers, Dennis )2008-03-13) Inexpensive Linux systems don't capture Wal-Martian's fancy. McsimumNews.com
- Vaughan-Nichols, Steven J. (2008-04-08), Customized Linux PC for MySpacers. eWeek.com
- Taub, Eric A. (2008-06-05) Smaller Than a Laptop, but Bigger Than a Phone. NYTimes.com
