= Apricot Computers =

British electronic company

Apricot Computers Ltd.
- Logo used from the early 1990s to 2005
- Formerly: Applied Computer Techniques Ltd. (1965–1985)
- Industry: Computer hardware
- Founded: 1965; 61 years ago
- Defunct: June 2005; 21 years ago
- Headquarters: UK
- Products: Apricot PC, Xi; Apricot Portable
- Parent: Mitsubishi Electric Corporation (1990–1999); Network Si UK Ltd (1999–2005)

Apricot Computers Ltd., originally Applied Computer Techniques Ltd. (ACT), was a British electronic company active from 1965 to 2005. The company had its greatest success during the 1980s as a manufacturer of personal computers for businesses, including the highly popular ACT Sirius 1, which for a time was the most popular 16-bit business computer in Europe. The company later released a number of MS-DOS–compatible computer systems, to varying degrees of commercial success.

Apricot was an innovative computer hardware company with a research and development center in Birmingham capable of manufacturing nearly every component of a personal computer, except for the integrated circuits (chips) themselves. This included custom BIOS development, system-level programming, silk-screening of motherboards, metal fabrication for internal chassis, and radio-frequency testing of the completed systems. The company pioneered several technical innovations, including the first commercial shipment of an all-in-one system with a 3.5-inch floppy drive (ahead of Apple). In the early 1990s, they also manufactured one of the world's most secure x86-based PCs, sold exclusively to the UK government. While Apricot were known for their culture of innovation, this resulted in some developments which were technically advanced but proved to be highly disadvantageous in the marketplace.

Apricot remained a UK-owned company until its acquisition by the Mitsubishi Electric Corporation (MELCO) in the early 1990s. Mitsubishi believed that this acquisition would help them compete against Japanese PC manufacturers, particularly, NEC, which commanded over 50% of the Japanese market at the time. Apricot began to outsource manufacturing, but it was still unable to compete. MELCO closed the company down, selling off the final assets in 1999. A management buyout resulted in a new company, Network Si UK Ltd being formed. In 2008, a second, independent Apricot company was launched in the UK.

== History ==
=== 1965–1980 ===
Apricot Computers was founded in 1965 as Applied Computer Techniques Ltd. (ACT). ACT was founded in the United Kingdom as a time-sharing service bureau for businesses in the Great Britain region. In the 1970s, it expanded into reselling office equipment such as copiers, leasing turn-key minicomputers, and providing telecommunications services such as electronic mail.

=== 1980–1985 ===
In 1980, ACT released their first microcomputer, the ACT-800, already produced and marketed in the US by Computhink as the Minimax, marketing this product in the UK under the ACT brand. Computhink's system was based on the 6502, but supported 64 additional user-definable instructions, with these being configured by default to support the instructions of the FIFTH programming language: "a combination of FORTH and Pascal". Minimax pricing started at $7,770, whereas pricing of the ACT-800 started at £3,950. Computhink would later announce computers based on the Motorola 68000.

In 1982, ACT signed a deal with Victor to distribute the Victor 9000 as the ACT Sirius 1 in the UK and Europe. Priced at £2,395 excluding VAT, the Sirius 1 could run CP/M-86 or MS-DOS, but it was not hardware-compatible with the IBM PC. The Sirius 1 became the most popular 16-bit business computer in Europe, especially in Britain and Germany, while IBM delayed the release of the PC in those markets.

The success of the Sirius 1 led to the Apricot PC or ACT Apricot in September 1983, based on an Intel 8086 microprocessor running at 4.77 MHz. Like the Sirius 1, it ran MS-DOS or CP/M-86 but was not compatible at a hardware level with the IBM PC. Instead, software compatibility with the Sirius 1 was prioritised, with the 800×400 pixel display resolution retained from the earlier model to serve this goal. It had two floppy disk drives, and was one of the first systems to use 3.5" disks, rather than the 5.25" disks which were the norm at the time. The keyboard featured eight conventional function keys along with six touch-sensitive programmable ones, the latter associated with a built-in LCD screen (2 lines of 40 characters) known as the Microscreen, which displayed the current function of the keys, or could be configured to echo the current command line in MS-DOS. The keyboard could use the Microscreen autonomously to operate as an integrated calculator, and the result of a calculation could be sent to the computer where it would appear on the command line or in the current application. However, this calculator function could still be used with the computer powered off. Microsoft Word and Multiplan were supplied with the Apricot PC. Lotus 1-2-3 was also available, and took advantage of the machine's high-resolution graphics. A flap covered the floppy drives when not in use. The industrial design of the machine was well conceived. The keyboard could be clipped to the base of the machine, and an integrated handle used for transporting it. The supplied green phosphor monitor had a nylon mesh glare filter.

A model with a built-in 10 MB hard disk (known as the Apricot PC Xi) was made available later in 1984. One enhancement in the original Apricot PC and PC Xi models over contemporary IBM PC compatibles was the inclusion of the SN76489 sound generator chip, also used in computers such as the BBC Micro, providing three sound channels, although support for these capabilities was absent from the BASIC implementation. Documentation for the chip was reportedly provided in the system's technical documentation.

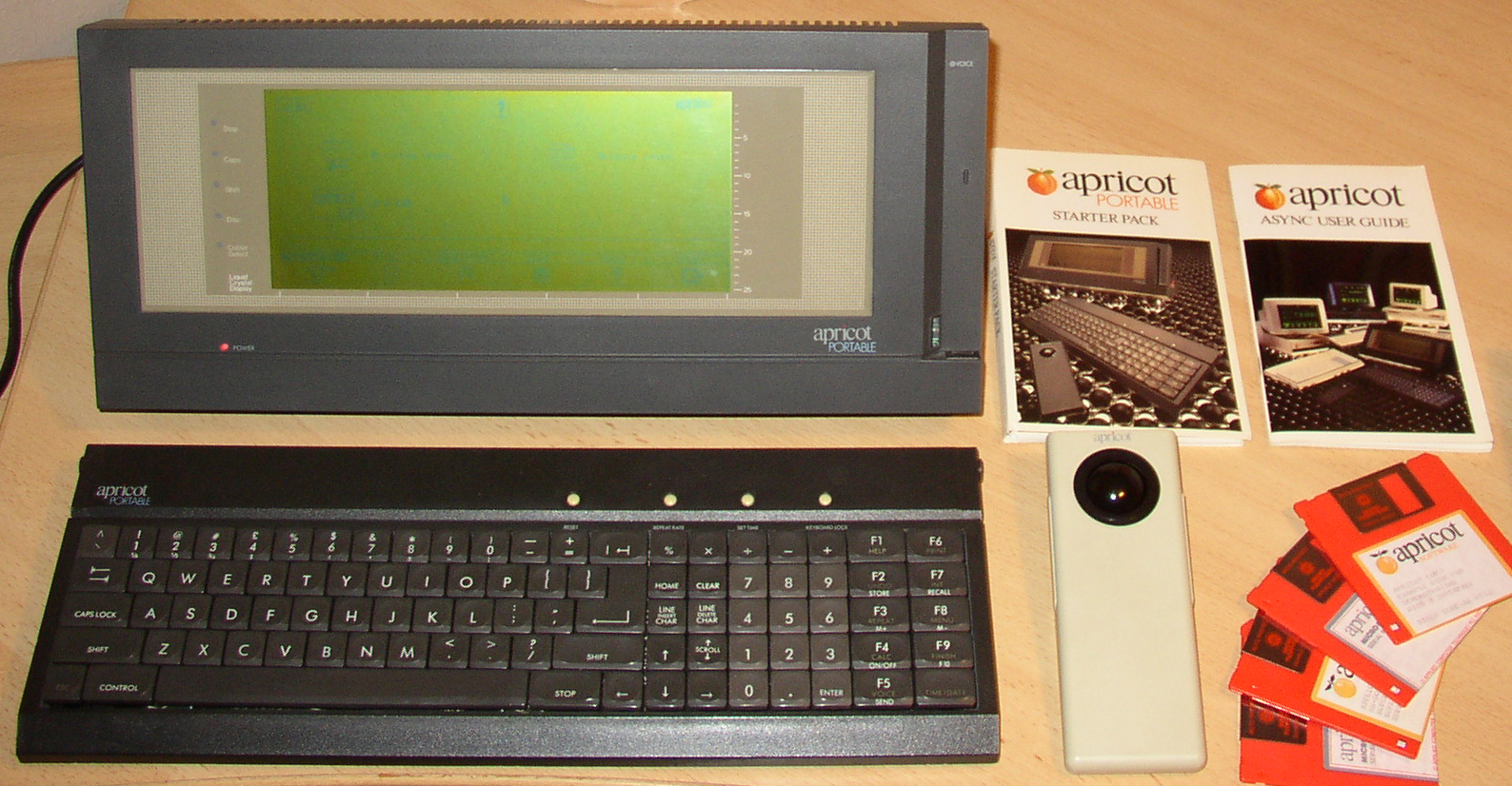
Apricot Portable

In 1984, ACT released the Apricot F1, aimed at the budget business computer market, fitted with 256 KB of RAM, running MS-DOS together with a GUI front end called Activity, this being a successor ACT's earlier Manager program. The system was bundled with software for graphics, communication, word processing, a spreadsheet, some games, and system tools, this accessible using the single, double-sided 3.5" floppy disk drive fitted within the main system unit. The supplied keyboard communicated with the main unit over an infrared data connection, offering some resilience against erroneous transmissions, although the link between any given keyboard and system was not specific to that pair of units, meaning that a keyboard could inadvertently send keystrokes to other systems. Apricot offered a fibre optic cable, effectively tethering the keyboard, as a remedy in environments with multiple units. A hybrid mouse/trackball, also employing infrared communication, was also included. Colour and monochrome monitors were offered as options, but purchasers could elect to use a composite monitor instead, with a modulator option available permitting connection to a television set. Unlike earlier models, the F1 provided a maximum display resolution of 640×256 featuring four colours from a choice of sixteen, as well as a 640 × 200 display mode for compatibility with IBM PC applications, but to mitigate potential software portability issues across its own range, Apricot supplied Digital Research's GSX software. A price of £995.00 for the base system, with monochrome and colour monitors costing £200.00 and £395.00 respectively. Like the Apricot PC, it was not IBM PC compatible. The machine was only successful in the UK.

Also in 1984, the Apricot Portable was released with an infrared keyboard and mouse/trackball, a voice system, 4.77 MHz CPU, 640 × 200 LCD for £1,695.

In December 1984, ACT established an American subsidiary in Santa Ana, California. Called Apricot, Inc., it was responsible for marketing Apricot computers in the country and was founded with $20 million in capital, $4 million of which from ACT itself and the rest from other investors.

=== 1985–1990 ===
Logo of Apricot Computers used from 1985 to the early 1990s

In 1985, ACT was renamed "Apricot Computers". By this time, the F1 had become one model in the F Series. Other machines in the series were the F1e (a cheaper F1), the F2 (with two floppy drives), and the F10 (with a 10 MB Rodime hard drive, 512 KB RAM and a more conventional-looking infrared keyboard). With the F10, the Activity GUI was replaced by GEM.

In contrast to the F1 with its 256 KB of RAM and double-sided floppy drive, the F1e was initially fitted with 128 KB of RAM and provided a 360 KB single-sided floppy drive, permitting its introduction at a lower price of £795.00. In mid-1985, Apricot cut the price of the model to £685.00 and increased the built-in RAM to 256 KB, putting it in more direct competition with the BBC Model B+ and Amstrad CPC 664 in the small business and hobbyist market. Apricot also sought to acquire market share in the education sector at Acorn's expense, with the price of £595.00 excluding VAT being particularly competitive with the £499.00 price of the 64 KB BBC Model B+.

Already by the end of 1985, however, the F1e along with earlier models were categorised as "continuation stock", purely available to dealers to supply existing customer installations and available at dealer prices giving discounts ranging from 34% for the F1e to 66% for the Apricot Portable. As part of Apricot's 1986 strategy, the F1e and Apricot Portable were to cease production in January 1986, narrowing the product range to three core F-series models, all providing 512 KB of RAM, GEM, colour graphics and a mouse.

Some F1e computers shipped with an expansion card could also be used in the F10, that would modulate the RGB video signal to RF enabling the computer to be used with a domestic television set. This card also contained a composite video output. The machine was unusual in that it contained the same 36-way Centronics parallel port that appeared on many contemporary printers (and continued to do so until virtually replaced with USB and Ethernet). This means that a standard 36-way centronics male to centronics male cable needs to be used to connect a printer – and these were hard to find since IBM had introduced the DB25F connector.

The F-series infrared keyboards contained a real-time clock; during the machine's boot sequence, the BIOS would graphically prompt the user to press the 'DATE/TIME' key. This would transmit the date and time settings from the keyboard to the computer via IR, setting the RTC in the computer. The Infra-Red trackball could also be used as a mouse by tilting the unit forward – the ball protrudes from the top and bottom of the unit and can roll on a surface. The units also shipped with fibre-optic 'Light Pipes' that can channel the IR signals, designed to prevent multiple keyboards and trackballs from interfering with adjacent machines in office environments where multiple F-series computers were (predicted to be) in use.

The F10 shipped with a 'PC Emulator' which provided very limited text-mode support for IBM PC compatible applications, but was unable to run applications that used graphics modes. Microsoft Windows 1.03, little-known and little-used at the time, would not run in this environment.

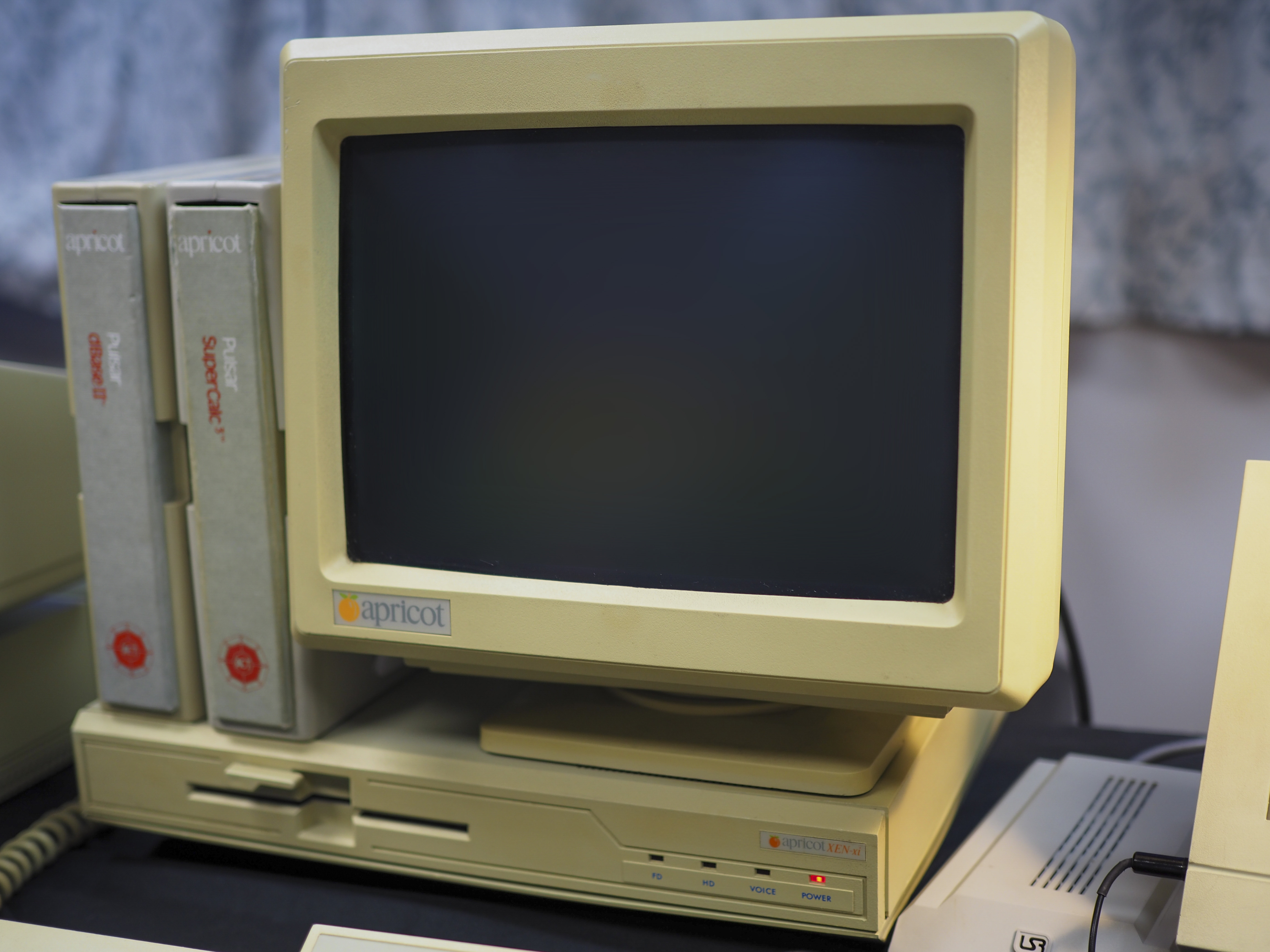
Apricot XEN-xi

The last Apricot computer not to be IBM compatible was the XEN (October 1985), a 286-based system intended to compete with the IBM AT and running Microsoft Windows (now known as Windows 1.0). It was superseded in 1986 by the Xen-i, the first in a line of IBM-compatible systems. The Xen-i initially shipped with a 5.25" floppy drive to further improve its IBM-compatibility. The 3.5" drive made a reappearance when IBM themselves switched formats with the release of the PS/2 range.

In 1987, Apricot bought the rights to assemble the Sequent Computer Systems multi-processor 80386 Symmetry Unix system in the UK.

In 1989, a cover story in Byte magazine announced the Apricot VX FT as the world's first machine to incorporate the Intel 80486 microprocessor. This machine, designed by Bob Cross, was a fault-tolerant file server based on Micro Channel Architecture, incorporating an external RAM cache and its own UPS. The VX FT line consisted of Series 400 and Series 800, with four different models each. These (and their other systems) were manufactured in their state-of-the-art factory in Glenrothes, Fife, Scotland.

British magazines dedicated to the early Apricots were Apricot User, which had the official approval of Apricot Computers, and the more technically oriented Apricot File.

=== 1990–2000 ===
Logo of Apricot under ownership of Mitsubishi Electric

In January 1990 Apricot acquired Information Technology Limited, a UK-based developer of UNIX systems. Apricot took the opportunity to change its name back to the original, ACT.

Apricot continued to experiment with alternative form factors in a market dominated by standardised beige boxes. They produced a range of high-availability servers (the VX and Shogun ranges) with integrated uninterruptible power supply (UPS), low-profile 'LANStation', PCs specifically designed for use on office networks, and diskless workstations booted over the network.

Apricot's long-running pattern of investing in technical innovation, and complete end-to-end system design and manufacture created technically excellent computers but meant that Apricot was slow to adapt as the global market grew and changed. By the mid-1990s major PC OEMs such as Compaq and Hewlett-Packard were outsourcing their own complete end-to-end system design and manufacture to Original Design Manufacturers (ODMs) based in Taiwan, and were moving at least some of their manufacturing to cheaper locations overseas. Apricot was comparatively slow in adopting this method of manufacturing, even though a motherboard designed and manufactured in Asia cost as little as a third of the cost of design and testing in Birmingham and manufacture in Scotland.

In April 1990 ACT's Apricot computer manufacturing business was bought by Mitsubishi Electric Corporation (MELCO), with ACT retaining only the software side. This essentially marked the end of their unique design style. Subsequent products were far more conventional designs.

In 1991, Apricot were the largest partner in a consortium developing a completely new computer-aided dispatch system (LASCAD) for the London Ambulance Service. The IT firm won the contract by significantly underbidding other proposals. Though a later inquiry's examination of the Apricot computer hardware aspect revealed no major problems, the end-to-end solution by the consortium of providers failed disastrously on its first day in full operation, and is often used a case study in the failure of IT project management.

Mitsubishi Electric Apricot models during the 1990s included workstations, LAN terminals and notebooks.

In June 1999 the Glenrothes factory stopped production and in October 1999, Apricot-Mitsubishi European operations were closed. Apricot's assets were sold. A management buyout resulted in a new company, Network Si UK Ltd. It lasted from 2001 to 2014. Established in 1992, ACT Network Si was originally a "network-based systems integration" division of the software and services business, ACT Group Plc, which remained independent of the Mitsubishi-acquired business.

=== 2008–2012 ===
In 2008 a new, independent company was launched in the UK, with its first product coming out in October 2008 – the Apricot Picobook Pro, a VIA NanoBook-based netbook. However, this suffered from poor reviews and the new Apricot Computers Limited was dissolved in May 2012.

== See also ==
- Digital Microsystems Ltd. (DML)
