= CloudBook =

Ultra-mobile PC developed by Everex

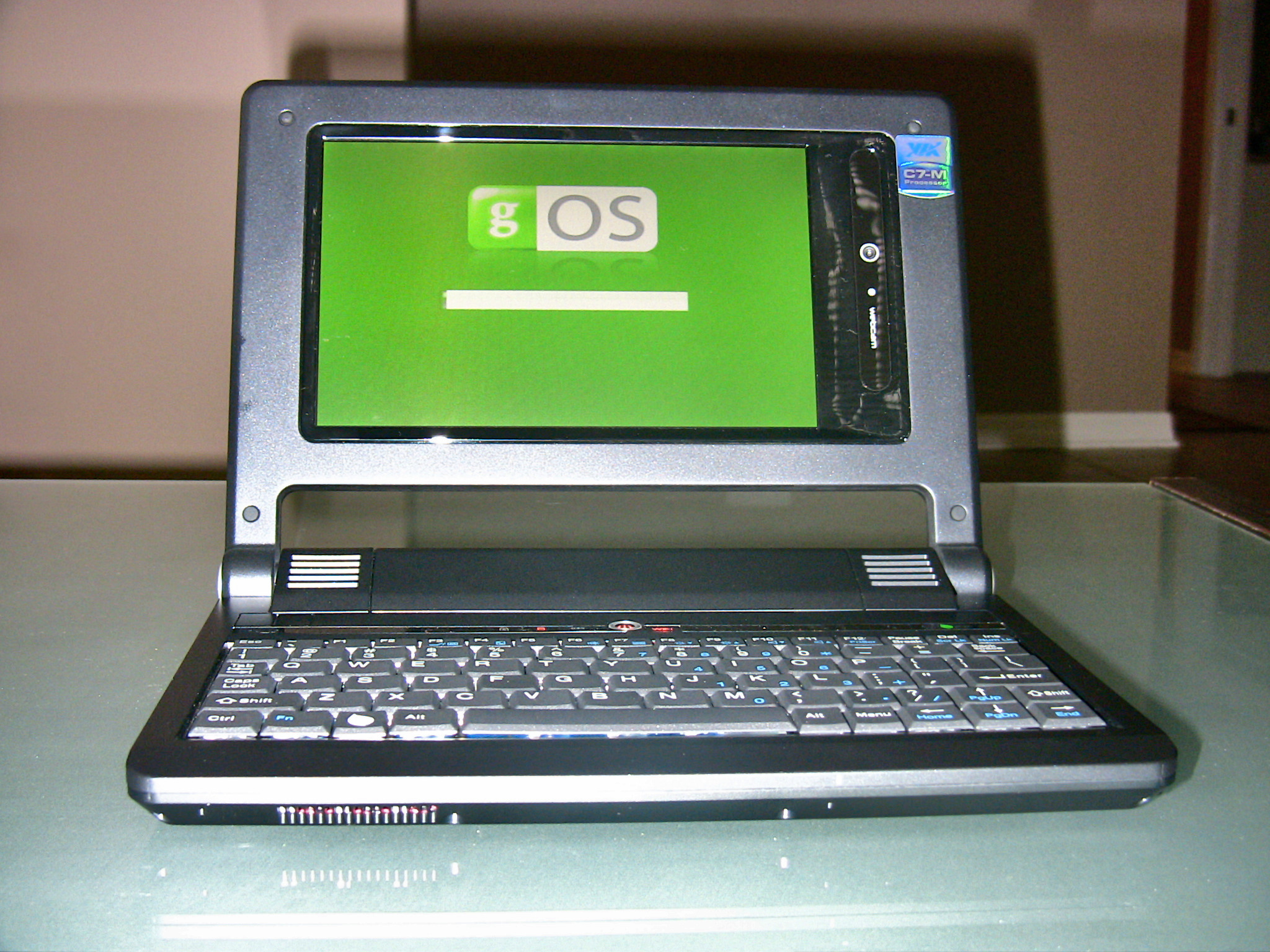
- Manufacturer: Everex
- Type: Subnotebook/Netbook
- Media: 30 GB hard drive
- Operating system: Ubuntu, GNOME, AWN-based gOS "V2 Rocket"
- CPU: VIA C7-M ULV 1.2 GHz
- Memory: 512 MB (expandable to 1 GB)
- Display: 18 cm (7″) WVGA TFT (800×480) on VIA UniChrome Pro IGP
- Input: Keyboard, touchpad VIA VT1708A audio
- Camera: 0.3-megapixel (640×480)
- Connectivity: WLAN 802.11b/g Ethernet 100 Mbit/s; DVI-I, two USB 2.0 ports Card reader (SD, MMC, MS (PRO))
- Power: Four-cell Li-ion battery (14.4 V, 2200 mAh)
- Dimensions: 23 cm × 17 cm × 3 cm
- Weight: 0.91 kg

The CloudBook is a discontinued x86 subnotebook, or ultra-mobile PC developed by Everex using a VIA processor, chipset, and NanoBook reference design. It competed with the Asus Eee PC, the OLPC XO-1, and the Classmate PC. The device was categorized as a netbook when it was around 2008.

== History ==
Sales of the gPC TC2502 Everex desktop left the company with inquiries from customers seeking similar additional Open Source, but mobile platforms. Everex decided to build two systems, a classic laptop, also running gOS v2, called the gBook, and a system based on the VIA Nanobook reference design, which is also used for Packard Bell EasyNote XS. Its release was originally planned for January 25, 2008, but Everex pushed the release back citing problems with the version of gOS it wanted to use. The delay was needed because Everex wanted to rewrite gOS v2 for the CloudBook so it would use GNOME's window manager instead of Enlightenment 17, making it even more compatible with Ubuntu. The E17's Dock was replaced by the Avant Window Navigator to approach the same looks and functionality as the older gOS versions.

CloudBook was expected to be released in the United States on February 15, 2008 at Wal-Mart and ZaReason, but was pushed back to February 21 for Wal-Mart (ZaReason received a part of its shipment). The price of the device was set to US$399 and it came with one year of limited warranty with 24/7 toll free technical support.

Nivio also created a CloudBook based on Nokia/Intel's Meego platform; and owned the US Trademark for CloudBook, CloudPC. It was aiming to use a Linux platform for delivering a full windows experience (desktop as a service) with an app store for renting software. It launched this with Airtel in India. Nivio was co-founded by Sachin Dev Duggal and Saurabh P Dhoot.

== Features ==
The Everex CloudBook had a uniquely located built-in pointing device (a stamp-sized optical trackpad) on the upper right side of the computer instead of at the bottom of the keyboard as is common for notebook computers. The CloudBook was intended to be held in one hand while typing, or in two hands when using the mouse-cursor control, with the left thumb controlling the two "mouse buttons", and the right thumb the small trackpad, both mousepad and keys are placed directly under the screen. This design was chosen so the system could even be used when standing and walking around, instead of only when sitting. The CloudBook was sold as an ultra-mobile PC (UMPC) because of this feature, even though it does not have a touch-screen.

== Software ==
The CloudBook came with a completely new version, (compared to the version used in the gPC) of the gOS Linux distribution (based on Ubuntu) and application software from Mozilla, Skype, Facebook, faqly, OpenOffice.org and Google. Originally gOS came with the Enlightenment 0.17 as the window manager. Though the pre-installed operating system is gOS, Everex has released Windows XP hardware drivers, making it more simple to install Microsoft's Windows XP. However, Everex warns that any software outside of the original gOS will not be covered by warranty (though the hardware's warranty will be unaffected).

== CloudBook MAX ==
The next generation of CloudBook, was advertised to have a processor running at 1.6 GHz, an 80 GB disk drive, touch pad and WiMAX. However the company ceased operations.

== See also ==
- Everex green computers
- Sony U-series small laptop with a side-mounted pointing stick
- Palm Foleo
- Nokia N810
- Internet appliance
- Sylvania g netbook by gOS and Osram Sylvania based on the same design as the Cloudbook and also using gOS, the newer gOS 2.9 (escape Pod)
- Picobook Pro netbook based on the design of the CloudBook.
- Astone UMPC
