= GOS (operating system) =

Ubuntu-based Linux distribution

gOS
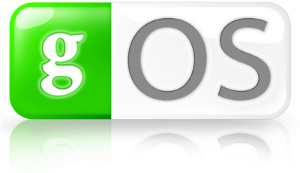

- gOS 3.1 was based on Ubuntu 8.04.1 LTS
- Developer: Good OS LLC
- OS family: Linux (Unix-like)
- Working state: Discontinued
- Source model: Open source
- Initial release: November 1, 2007; 18 years ago
- Final release: 3.1 / January 3, 2009; 17 years ago
- Available in: English
- Supported platforms: x86
- Kernel type: Monolithic (Linux)
- Default user interface: GNOME
- License: Creative Commons Attribution Noncommercial Share Alike 3.1 Unported
- Official website: web.archive.org/web/20081216020538/http://www.thinkgos.com/

gOS or "good OS" was an Ubuntu-based Linux distribution created by Good OS LLC, a Los Angeles-based corporation. Its CIO David Liu explained that after meeting Enlightenment and open source people, he realized that his dream to bring Web 2.0 applications into mainstream use could be achieved by creating a Linux distribution that made it easy for users to access Google and Web 2.0 applications. David Liu went on to create the Chinese Twitter clone called Wozai (我在), leaving gOS officially defunct.

== History ==
The company initially advertised gOS 1.0 as "An alternative OS with Google Apps and other Web 2.0 apps for the modern user." This first version of gOS (1.0.1_386) was based on Ubuntu 7.10 and the Enlightenment window manager E17.

On January 7, 2008, a test version (2.0.0-beta1) of gOS, intended to demonstrate the Everex CloudBook at the 2008 Consumer Electronics Show, and named gOS Rocket, was released. This version was also E17-based. The definitive second version of gOS debuted at the end February 2008, together with the launch of Everex's new CloudBook, the gBook laptop, and a new, second version of the gPC, the "encore". This version was called gOS V2 Rocket, and was completely rewritten and now based on the GNOME window manager, a built in Compositing window manager, and the Avant Window Navigator.

On April 6, 2008, Good OS launched a publicly available version of gOS, called gOS 2.9 "Space", intended for the gPC mini, This version is based on Compiz fusion, Gnome, and the Avant Window Navigator dock manager, but also uses E17 code. It has a dock with a "stack" very much like the "fan view" of Mac OS X v10.5.

On September 23, 2008, Good OS launched gOS 3 Gadgets, which is described by Good OS, as "The third and best version of gOS to date, Perfect for Netbooks". It is still based on GNOME but has replaced AWN with yet another launcher called Wbar. It introduces the full support for Wine 1.0, Picasa (using the Wine libraries) and Google Gadgets.

On December 1, 2008, Good OS announced its next operating system, Cloud. Cloud can be described as an "instant-on browser-based application environment". With Cloud, users can browse the Internet seconds after turning on their computer, and can also use it to run applications, like Skype, or a media player. Cloud shows a Dock similar to gOS 3 in the browser window, and will keep loading the main operating system (Windows, Linux, OSX) in the background. An icon in the Dock will tell the user when the main OS has finished booting in the background, and can be used to switch instantly to the main OS, when tasks not (yet) supported under Cloud are needed. A beta test program for Cloud version 1.0 was announced January 30, 2009.

On January 3, 2009, Good OS released gOS 3.1 Gadgets (SP1), or Service pack 1, a bug-fixed version of gOS 3.0. Simultaneously, the Good OS team also launched a new official forum, as a replacement for the Google discussion group used previously and faqly, which is now defunct.

Faqly was a cross between an Internet forum and a FAQ where gOS users could ask questions and browse for answers. Other gOS users, or Linux experts, could then provide answers to the questions. But Faqly had some large usability problems, notably the fact that users had problems deciding when the system was searching for an answer, or entering a new question. Additionally, questions and answers could not be edited or deleted.

Around May 2008, members of the Good OS team ceased posting online from gOS-associated accounts, including their own forum and website. While the website was still on-line, and gOS 3.1 could be downloaded, no sources of gOS are available.

Development of gOS seems to have been stalled, and the official forum at forum.thinkgos.com was not moderated anymore and was quickly overrun by spam and was closed halfway through 2009 (one of the few life-signs of the Good OS team after mid 2008); its function has been taken over by the unofficial forum. No sign of promised developments like the netbook launcher version or cloud have been realized.

The official GOS page www.thinkgos.com was last captured live by Internet Archive Wayback Machine on January 13, 2011; the next capture from February 2, 2011 is of the website yielding a "Site Temporarily Unavailable" message with an error code id "bad_httpd_conf". As of 2015, the thinkgos.com domain is no longer owned by David Liu. and no web site is configured for the domain.

According to DistroWatch.com, gOS is discontinued.

== Design ==
gOS-1 was based on the Ubuntu 7.10 distribution (later versions after 2.9 use version 8.04) and themed desktop environment somewhat similar in appearance to Mac OS X Leopard. The earlier versions (1 and 2-beta) used the Enlightenment 17 window manager instead of the usual GNOME or KDE desktops, to create a desktop that had a similar appearance to Mac OS X. Enlightenment acted both as an X window manager and a desktop environment. Therefore, early versions of gOS worked on systems as low end as a 350 MHz Pentium II with 196 MB of RAM, but a typical gOS system would have used as a minimum a 1 GHz Pentium III with 256 MB RAM. After gOS2-beta the later versions of gOS abandoned the use of Enlightenment as desktop manager (although some E17 code still seemed to be used), in favor of using GNOME, with Compiz Fusion and the Avant Window Navigator. This increased the need for memory to values similar to normal Ubuntu.

Based on the idea of cloud computing, all versions of gOS lean heavily on on-line applications built on Web 2.0 and AJAX technology so they also do not use much hard disk space for applications. The whole gOS-1 system fitted comfortably in less than 2 GB. Also many of the documents created with gOS, such as Google Docs documents, can be saved on Google servers instead of on the local hard disk, so gOS can work with very small hard disks. In gOS V2 Rocket, Good OS introduced the use of Google's "Google Gears" technology which promises to make Google's web applications usable without an Internet connection. Currently, Google Reader and Google Docs are the only supported Google applications, though other web applications such as Remember the Milk have added Google Gears functionality.

gOS 2.0 Rocket's primary features include a Mac OS X-like Dock called "the Launcher" (using Avant Window Navigator in gOS Rocket G and gOS Space, and iTask-NG in gOS Rocket E), containing icons to launch programs like the Firefox web browser, Rhythmbox audio player, Xine video player, and Skype for Internet telephony. There are also options to open many Google-based web application like Google Mail, Google Docs, Google Calendar, and Google Maps. Other programs could be added to the Launcher as well. The first E17-based version of gOS used another Dock-style interface called the iBar.

Other installed programs could be started through menus, among the most important was the photo and picture editing program GIMP, the document viewer Evince, and the OpenOffice.org office suite. More programs could be installed using the built-in Synaptic Package Manager.

== Versions ==
=== gOS 1.0.1 ===
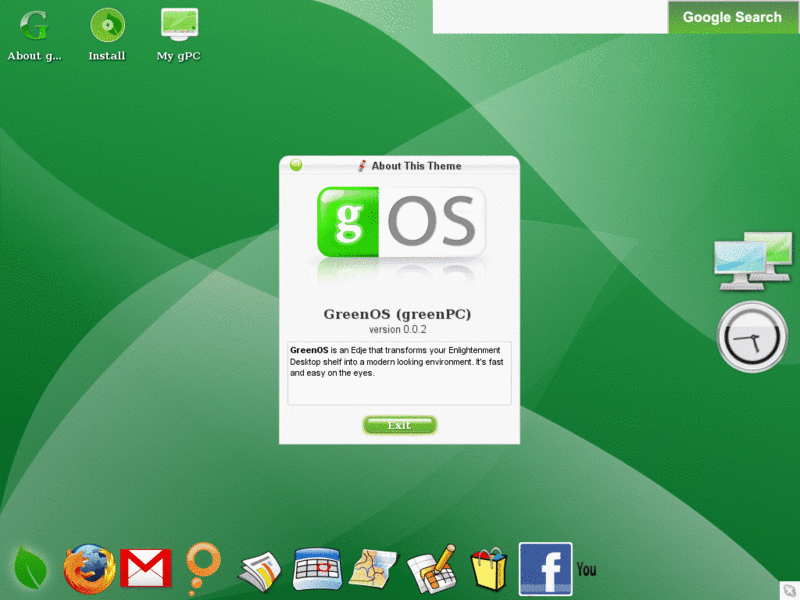
gOS 1.0.1 desktop

gOS 1.0.1 was introduced on November 1, 2007, preinstalled on the Everex Green gPC TC2502 sold at Wal-Mart. gOS 1.0.1 fully supported the advanced Power management capabilities of the gPC TC2502, so the system could be put in suspend mode and after turning on again was ready in a few seconds.

In December 2007, PC Club followed suit and reintroduced their Enpower Fuzion desktop for sale with gOS installed for $189, which is their second system to include a Linux distribution since their controversial temporary inclusion of Linspire (then LindowsOS) in late 2003/early 2004 and the sale of the Empower Essence system with Ubuntu during the month of June 2007.

Everex followed on by creating the CloudBook, a laptop based on the VIA NanoBook reference. The CloudBook was bundled with gOS Rocket with a hint that later versions would include a touchscreen. At an RRP of $400, it was to compete with the ASUS Eee PC in the cheap miniature Laptop space. Less well known is the fact that Everex simultaneously also worked on a more classic notebook, called the gBook, and on the Mac mini like gPC mini all designed to run gOS v2.

Online vendor ClubIT.com offered a RoHS-compliant VIA C7 developer board bundled with gOS.

=== gOS 2-beta (gOS Rocket E) ===
gOS Rocket E desktop

On 2008-01-07, Good OS LLC released a beta of the second version of gOS, called gOS-live-2.0.0-beta1 and nicknamed "Rocket". However this version did not seem to be a valid replacement for rev 1.0.1 as it was missing some essential functions, such as hardware and system administration tools, and the easy to use application installer "Add/Remove". It also missed the capability to access CDs and hard-disk partitions other than its own. The demo version status of this version became extra apparent when the new Everex CloudBook which was due to debut January 25, 2008 was delayed for a month to allow Good OS time to rewrite this second version of gOS for the CloudBook, gBook. and second version of the gPC. On April 11, 2008, Good OS released an updated version of gOS Rocket E. In addition, a fan of gOS has also released an unauthorized remaster of gOS Rocket E which includes the aforementioned system administration tools and drive mounting as well as the Thunar file manager.

=== gOS V2 Rocket (gOS Rocket G) ===
Avant Window Navigator

Later it became apparent that the month was needed because Everex had decided that future versions of gOS for the Cloudbook, gBook and gPC2, would use the GNOME desktop environment, instead of E17. It was announced that this version would also be called "Rocket", to be precise gOS V2 "Rocket", (this version would also be offered to new gPC2 users) and would use the Avant Window Navigator system to create a dock to resemble the older gOS versions in looks and functionality. Until the launch of gOS 2.9 this version was not available as a Live CD, but only to CloudBook owners. But after the launch of 2.9 it has now also become available as a Live_CD download from one of the mirrors as found on the Good OS web-site. This version is now referenced to as "gOS rocket G" ("G" for Gnome) to distinguish it from the older beta version now called "gOS rocket E", which is also still available for download.

=== gOS 2.9 Space ===
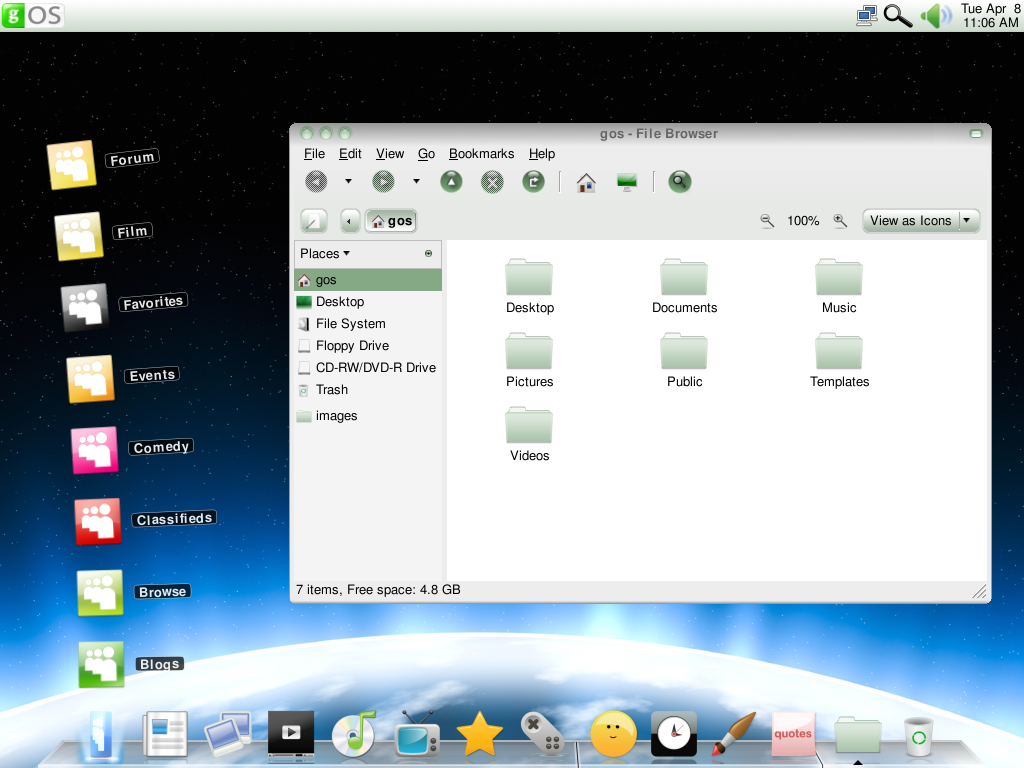
gOS Space

gOS 2.9 Space became available as a generic Linux distribution on April 7, 2008, and is a debugged and extended version of the older gOS V2 Rocket G. It can be downloaded as an .ISO that can be burned on a DVD (it is slightly too large for a CD), or can be put on another external bootable medium such as a memory stick or Secure Digital card reader acting as an external USB drive, with enough capacity. A gOS 2.9 DVD was also announced to be sold from The Good OS store on their website, but until now has not become available. gOS Space is loaded with new MySpace features, but all the existing Google applications can still be used. As a Linux distribution, 2.9 is much more complete than 2.0-beta and is also less buggy. gOS Space is less "light" (using a small amount of memory) than older, publicly available versions, as it is based on a combination of Ubuntu 7.10, the GNOME windows manager enhanced with Compiz fusion, and the Avant Window Navigator, a Dock-like launcher that has been enhanced with Stacks. According to Good OS, there is also Enlightenment code used, but its exact purpose is still unknown. In any case gOS Space needs about 384MB of RAM to work reasonably, the same amount as straight Ubuntu 7.10. When Ubuntu 8.04 (Hardy Heron) became available on April 24, 2008 it became obvious that trying to upgrade gOS 2.9 to the new Ubuntu renders it without any working kernels, leaving a non-working system, so upgrading gOS has been disabled by Good OS. It is not expected that this will be fixed, but that instead a new gOS (rev 3.0) will be released, based on Ubuntu 8.04.

=== gOS 2.9M Escape Pod ===
As of July 2, 2008 Good OS, in consortium with Digital Gadgets, launched the Sylvania g netbook. The Sylvania name is used under license by Digital Gadgets. Its similar to the original Everex CloudBook with more memory, and the trackpad and buttons have moved to the front of the device. the new system runs gOS 2.9M, a specially modified version of gOS 2.9 "space" based on Ubuntu 8.04

=== gOS 3.0 Gadgets ===
About a month after a first beta version, the final version of gOS 3.0 was released on the gOS website on September 23, 2008. It features integrated Google Gadgets integrated into the desktop (not in a browser window) and includes Wine 1.0 and Mozilla Prism. gOS 3.0 is based on the newer Ubuntu 8.04.1. This version goes "back to its roots", as it is intended for netbooks. The Avant Window Navigator's (abbreviated AWN or Awn) dock-like bar has been removed in favor of a more "lightweight" launch bar called Wbar. It is similar to the one used in the first Enlightenment-based gOS version. The gOS 3.0 Gadgets Live CD can be downloaded from the thinkgos site. In an official press release issued on August 6, 2008, gOS 3.0 Gadgets was announced to use LXDE technology but this plan was later put aside. Launching Synaptic will reveal that none of the applications listed at LXDE's About page are installed.

=== gOS 3.1 Gadgets ===
gOS 3.1 Gadgets was launched on January 3, 2009 as an upgraded bug fixed version of gOS 3.0 gadgets. This version fixes some bugs in gOS 3.0, but it isn't an obligatory update for users of 3.0 because bugfixes in gOS 3.0 are distributed using the built-in updater automatically. This version has had over 45,000 downloads.

=== Netbook Launcher ===
On October 22, 2008, a beta version of the gOS Netbook Launcher was released. This is an independently developed extension of gOS that gives gOS 3.0 Gadgets the possibility to switch to a new "netbook user interface", similar to Ubuntu Netbook Remix. You can switch between a netbook user interface and the classic gOS desktop at will. This Launcher is provided by the gOS Community and is not officially supported by Good OS for system manufacturers. It is still in beta, and therefore contains some bugs. One remaining problem is that it does not work well with Compiz.

== Upgrade problem for versions before gOS 2.9M ==
When Ubuntu released version 8.04 (Hardy Heron) on April 24, 2008, it became apparent that gOS (versions before gOS 2.9M Escape pod) could no longer use the update/upgrade facilities that Ubuntu offered. Any attempt to upgrade any version of gOS before version 2.9M will either fail with an "incompatible windows manager" error or will remove all kernels from the system. Version 3.0 of gOS solves the problem, as it is actually based on Ubuntu 8.04. Good OS claims that new versions of gOS won't use Ubuntu's upgrading repositories, to prevent the problem from happening again.

== Version history table ==
| Colour | Meaning |
|---|---|
| Red | Release no longer officially available |
| Green | Release still officially available |
| Blue | Future release |
| White | Not publicly available |

| Version (screenshots) | Code name | development name | Release date | released for | Based on | Freely available? | Desktop Manager | Dock manager | Features and Changes |
|---|---|---|---|---|---|---|---|---|---|
| 1.0.1_386 | gOS | Painfull | 2007-11-01 | Everex gPC | Gutsy Gibbon | Yes Live_CD | E17 | iBar | Initial release; Based on Ubuntu 7.10 and the Enlightenment 17 Desktop environment, plus many Google applications |
| 2.0.1-beta1 Screenshot | gOS Rocket (E) | Reloaded | 2008-01-07 | Everex CloudBook Demo at CES 2008 | Gutsy Gibbon | Yes Live_CD | E17 | iBar | Beta demo version especially developed to demonstrate with the Everex CloudBook at the 2008 Consumer Electronics Show. still based on Enlightenment 17 desktop |
| V2 | gOS Rocket (G) | Unknown | 2008-02-22 | Everex CloudBook, gBook, gPC and gPC2 | Gutsy Gibbon | V2 NO, gOS 2G Yes | GNOME | AWN | Final version as delivered installed on the CloudBook, and later the gBook and the gPC2. Not available as a live CD until the launch of Space. Now based on AWN and Compiz fusion. |
| 2.9 | gOS Space | Unknown | 2008-04-06 | Everex gPC mini | Gutsy Gibbon | Yes as Live_CD | GNOME | AWN | Specially promoted as a version for MySpace users, adds "stacks" to the AWN launcher, and uses MySpace applications, does not need 3D hardware to support AWN. Fits on a live DVD. |
| 2.9M | gOS Escape pod 2.9M | Unknown | 2008-02-07 | Sylvania g netbook | Hardy Heron (8.04) | No, only on g-netbook | GNOME | AWN | Specific "light" version, especially developed for netbook systems |
| 3.0 beta | gOS 3.0 Gadgets beta | Aphrodite | 2008-08-06 | Netbooks | Hardy Heron (8.04.1) | Yes, as live CD | GNOME | Wbar | Light netbook version that supports the Google desktop, including Google Gadgets, and adds Wine 1.0, and Picasa. Fits on a Live CD, but it was a beta and had a few bugs. |
| 3.0 final | gOS 3.0 Gadgets final (Gnome) | Aphrodite | 2008-09-24 | Netbooks and Nettops | Hardy Heron (8.04.1) | Yes, as live CD | GNOME | Wbar | Light netbook version that supports the Google desktop, including Google Gadgets, and adds Wine 1.0, and Picasa. Fits on a Live CD. Other flavors are still announced. |
| 3.1 (SP1) | gOS 3.1 Gadgets (SP1) (Gnome) | Aphrodite | 2009-01-03 | Netbooks and Nettops | Hardy Heron (8.04.1) | Yes, as live CD | GNOME | Wbar | Upgrade (bug fixed) version (service pack 1) of gOS 3.0 |
| 3.0 (Netbook edition beta) | gOS 3.0 Gadgets final with netbook launcher beta | Unknown | 2008-10-22 (beta) | Netbooks and Nettops | Hardy Heron (8.04.1) | The free netbook launcher can be installed on top of regular gOS 3.0. | GNOME | Wbar | for gOS 3 a special netbook application launcher is released, although it is still in beta, and is developed independently from Good OS. With it you can switch between a Netbook launcher or the classic gOS desktop. |

== Live USB ==
A Live USB of gOS can be created manually or with UNetbootin.

== See also ==
- EasyPeasy
- Everex green computers
- Goobuntu
- ChromeOS
- Joli OS
- LXDE
- Zonbu
