= Apricot Portable =

Personal computer

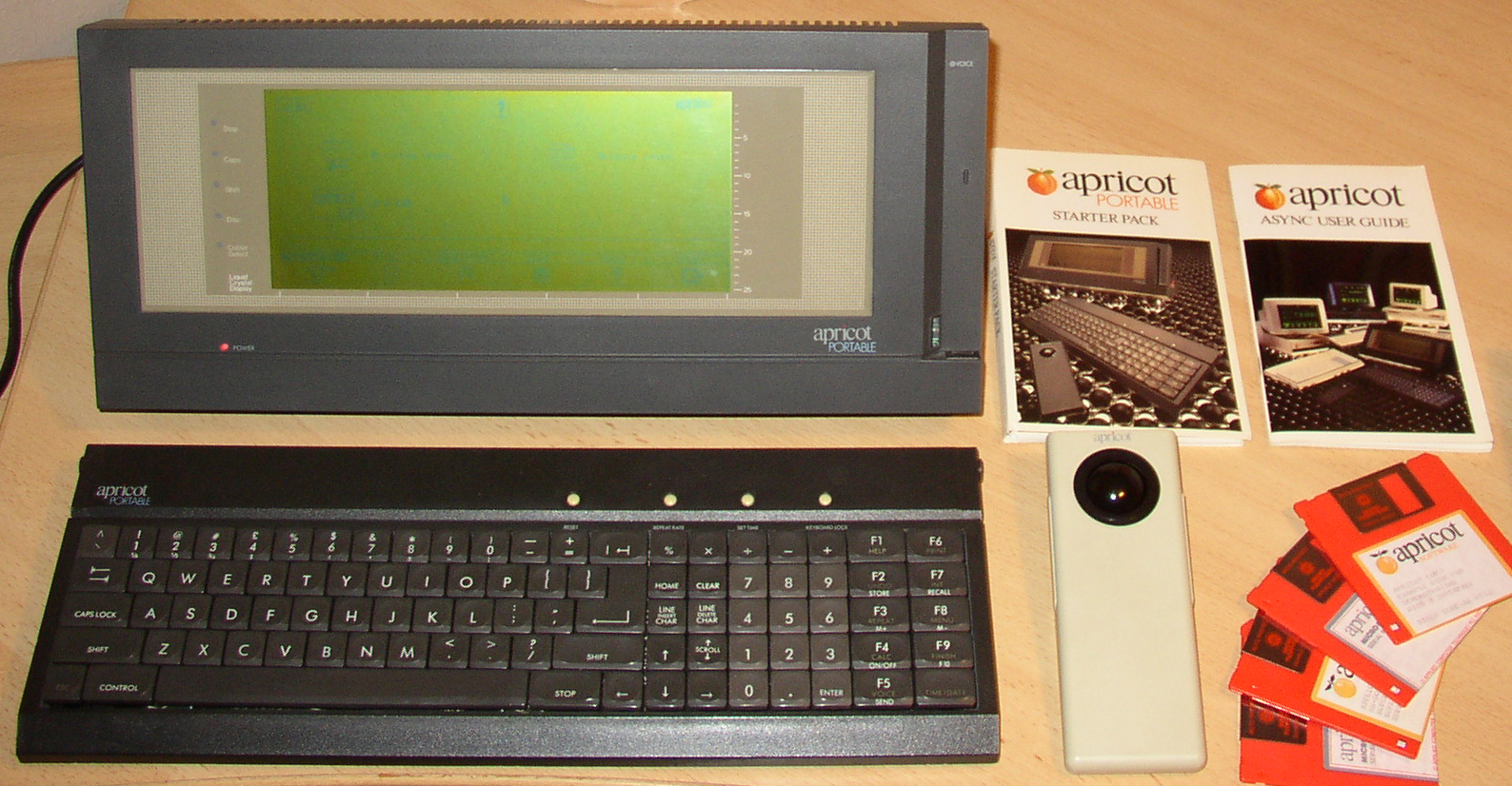
- Developer: ACT Ltd.
- Type: portable computer
- Released: 1984; 42 years ago
- Introductory price: £1,965 (equivalent to £7,978 in 2023)
- Operating system: MS-DOS 2.11, Concurrent CP/M, CP/M-86
- CPU: Intel 8086 CPU @ 5 MHz
- Memory: 256 KB RAM, expandable to 768 KB
- Storage: 3.5" floppy drive
- Display: Built-in monochrome LCD, optional external 16-colour display
- Connectivity: Infrared wireless keyboard, optional wireless mouse
- Dimensions: 45 cm × 20 cm × 17.2 cm
- Weight: 5.8 kg

The Apricot Portable was a personal computer manufactured by ACT Ltd., and was released to the public in November 1984. It was ACT's first attempt at manufacturing a portable computer, which were gaining popularity at the time. Compared to other portable computers of its time like the Compaq Portable and the Commodore SX-64, the Apricot Portable was the first system to have an 80-column and 25-line LCD and the first with a speech recognition system.

The Apricot Portable was designed to be easily carried in its case, but was powered by mains electricity only. It consisted of a central unit containing the motherboard, monochrome display and a floppy disk drive. It also came with a wireless keyboard and bundled software.

== Design ==
Apricot Portable 1984

The Apricot Portable was contained inside a hard charcoal gray carrying case and consisted of two main parts: the central unit (with built-in monitor) and the keyboard. An optional mouse-like track board was also available. It was used by either pointing the track board at the computer and moving the trackball around with one's thumb or rolling the trackball on a flat surface. A standard serial mouse could also be used via the RS-232 port on the back of the computer. The mouse and the keyboard were both battery-powered, but the computer itself did not run on batteries and needed to be plugged into a wall outlet.

The system was 450 mm long, 172 mm wide and 200 mm high, weighing a total of 13 pounds.

The Portable's overall design was unusual in that the computer and keyboard were not connected physically, but rather by infrared signal. If an object blocked the space in between the two components, their communication would be disrupted. ACT chose to use an infrared signal communication system because it was cheaper than using a cable connection.

== Features ==
The Apricot Portable contained a variety of features including a built-in disk drive, a speech recognition system, and a software bundle.

=== Display ===
The Portable was known for having the first 25-line liquid-crystal display (LCD) screen on a portable computer. The LCD screen was originally made by Hitachi, however ACT was not satisfied with the speed of its controller chip, prompting the company to design its own faster controller. This screen could also display graphics at a resolution of 640x200 pixels.

The optional colour monitor could display up to 8 colors at a time out of a possible 16 colors, and could run at either 640x200@60 Hz or 640x256@50 Hz. The Portable could continue to use its LCD while also driving the colour display, allowing separate information to be shown on each screen.

=== Disk drive ===
A single double-sided 720 KB 3.5" floppy disk drive was built into the right-hand side of the enclosure. An external 10 MB Rodime 3.5" hard drive was available.

=== Voice recognition system ===
The Apricot Portable was the first portable computer to utilize a voice speech recognition system. A microphone was clipped to the front of the unit that was used specifically for this system. It could be used while clipped to the unit or it could be unclipped and used in-hand. The voice recognition system had the ability to store a vocabulary up to 4096 words, of which only 64 could be held in memory at a time.

The speech recognition system could operate in a dictation mode where spoken words were transcribed as text, or it could associate a spoken term with a command to be run. The system was then trained by the user repeating the words into a microphone to allow for normal variations in speech. The more times a word was repeated, the better the result.

=== Software ===
The Apricot Portable was bundled with both the MS-DOS and CP/M-86 operating systems, software including a word processor called SuperWriter, SuperPlanner, a personal diary called ACT Diary, the SuperCalc spreadsheet and ACT Sketch. An interactive tutorial disk was provided.

Apricot computers used versions of the MS-DOS operating system not constrained to the maximum 640 KB of RAM supported by the IBM PC and true clones, allowing the Portable to make use of 768 KB.

The Portable could run most software for MS-DOS. Like other Apricot computers, it could be started up from a CP/M-86 or Concurrent CP/M boot disc, and would then run CP/M-86 software in single- or multi-user mode.

In addition, a GUI program called "Activity" was provided as a more convenient way to manipulate the file system with the keyboard or the optional mouse. It presented an icon-based interface reminiscent of the Apple Macintosh, allowing the user to manage files, format disks, create new icons, keyboard layouts and characters. Help pages and a tutorial mode were also available.

== Price ==
A basic model of the Apricot Portable with 256 KB of RAM (expandable to 768 KB) was sold for £1695 (approximately US$2460). The additional colour display with 128 KB RAM and a mouse added £300 ($435) to its price. The price of the original model was lowered in 1985 when a new version was released with 512 KB of RAM.

== See also ==
- Timeline of portable computers
