= Reference design =

A reference design is a technical design of a system that is intended for others to copy. It contains the essential elements of the system; however, third parties may enhance or modify the design as required. When discussing computer designs, the concept is generally known as a reference platform.

The main purpose of reference design is to support companies in development of next generation products using latest technologies. The reference product is proof of the platform concept and is usually targeted for specific applications. Reference design packages enable a fast track to market thereby cutting costs and reducing risk in the customer's integration project.

As the predominant customers for reference designs are original equipment manufacturers (OEMs), many reference designs are created by technology component vendors, whether hardware or software, as a means to increase the likelihood that their product will be designed into the OEM's product, giving them a competitive advantage.

== Examples ==
- NanoBook, a reference design of a miniature laptop
- Open source hardware (also Category:Open source hardware)
  - RONJA, a free and open telecommunication technology ("free Internet")
  - VIA OpenBook, a free and open reference design of a laptop
