= Apricot File =

Apricot File was a British magazine catering to users of early Apricot Computers microcomputer systems. It was based in London, published by TP Group and edited throughout its lifetime by Dennis Jarrett. The magazine was in circulation between 1985 and 1988.

== History and profile ==
There were 36 issues, all in A4 format: the first, called Release 1.1, was dated October 1985 and the last, Release 3.12, was undated but appeared in September or October 1988. Contents included consumer reviews of Apricot hardware and software, and technical advice on programming for Apricots. David Langford regularly contributed The Disinformation Column from Release 1.2 (November 1985) until the final issue. Other regular contributors were: Edward N Bromhead, Henry Deckhand (a pseudonymous cynic), Lindsay Doyle, Roger Gann, Paul N Humphreys, Garreth Keogh, Kathy Lang, Paul Lavin, Simon Potter, David St. John-Wallis and Mark Whitehorn.

Dennis Jarrett's farewell editorial (The Last Word) noted that Apricot File subscribers were being steadily lost "to the beckoning lure of IBM-compatibility."
