= VIA OpenBook =

Taiwanese laptop reference design

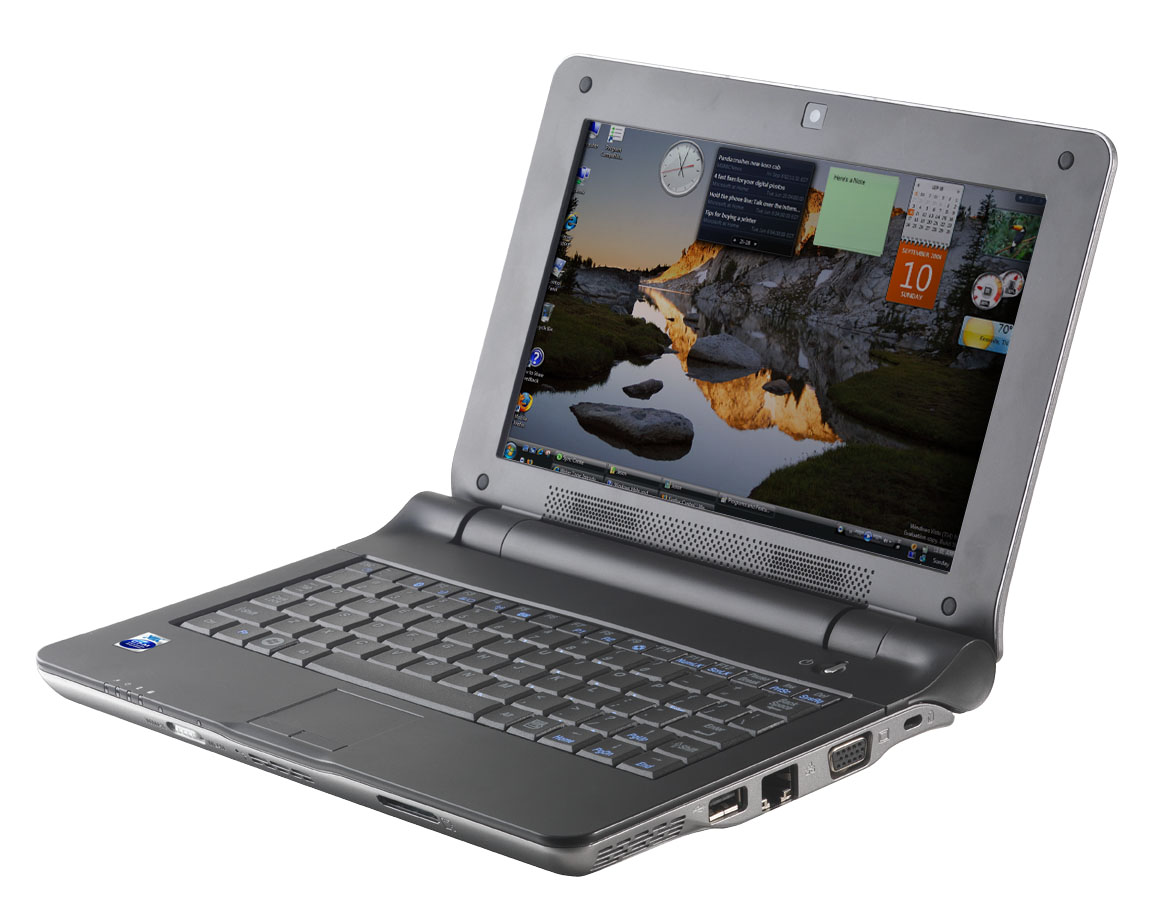
- VIA OpenBook
- Developer: VIA Technologies
- Released: May 27, 2008
- Predecessor: NanoBook
- Website: web.archive.org/web/20100329072842/http://www.viaopenbook.com/

VIA OpenBook is a laptop reference design from VIA Technologies, announced in 2008. The laptop case design was released as open source.

== Specifications ==
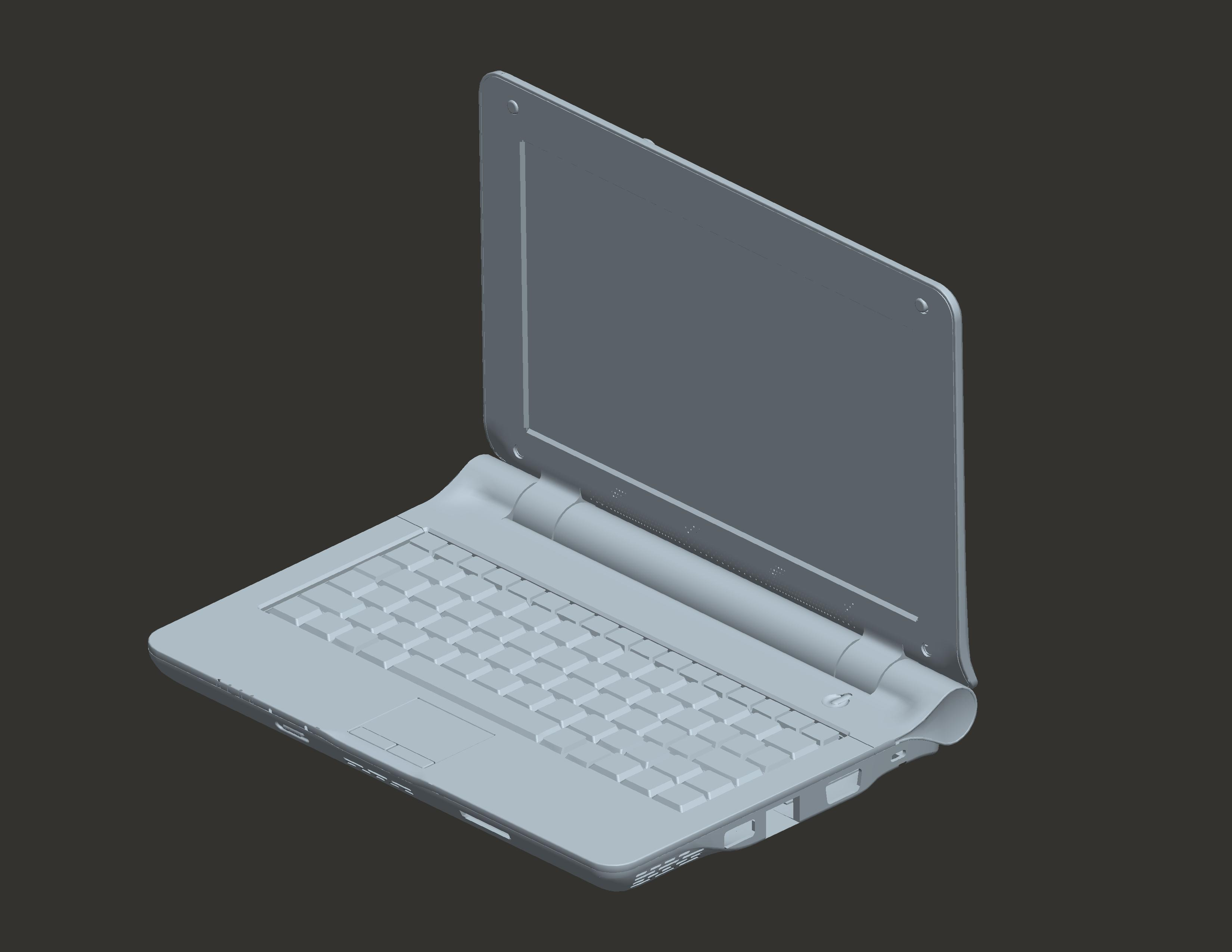
VIA OpenBook reference design CAD visualisation

=== Dimensions ===
- Dimensions: 24.0w x 17.5d x 3.62h cm (at battery), (9.45w x 6.89d x 1.43h in)
- Weight: under 1 kg

=== Processor, memory ===
- Processor: 1.0 GHz VIA Nano ULV
- Chipset: VIA VX800 unified
- Memory: DDR2 SO-DIMM up to 2 GB
- Hard disk: 160 GB or above

=== Networking, wireless ===
- Networking: 10/100/1000 Mbit/s Broadcom Giga NIC Ethernet
- Wireless: 802.11b/g Broadcom or 802.16e GCT
- Bluetooth, Wi-Fi, WiMAX, EV-DO /W-CDMA, HSDPA, GPS options.

=== Peripherals ===
- Screen: LED 8.9" WVGA 1024 x 600
- Graphics: VIA Chrome9 HC3 DX9 3D engine with shared system memory up to 256 MB
- Card reader: 4-in-1 embedded
- USB: 3 x (Ver. 2.0 Type A Port)
- Audio: Realtek HD audio codec, 2 speakers
- Audio jacks: 1 microphone-in, 1 headphone out
- Camera: CCD 2.01 megapixel, dual-headed rotary

=== Battery ===
- Battery: 4 cell

== See also ==
- Open-design movement
