= Apricot PC =

Personal computer model, 1983

- Also known as: ACT Apricot
- Manufacturer: Apricot Computers
- Type: Personal computer
- Released: Late 1983; 43 years ago
- Operating system: Came with standard MS-DOS 2.11 and CP/M-86.
- CPU: 4.77 MHz @ Intel 8086 CPU; Socket for optional Intel 8087 co-processor.
- Memory: RAM 256 kB (Max 768 kB)
- Storage: 2 × 3.5" floppy drives with 315 kB or 720 kB capacity
- Display: CRT green-screen 9"
- Graphics: Hitachi 46505: Text mode 80 × 25 or graphics 800 × 400 pixels
- Input: Keyboard with an integrated LCD

The Apricot PC (originally called the ACT Apricot) is a personal computer produced by Apricot Computers, then still known as Applied Computer Techniques or ACT. Released in late 1983, it was ACT's first independently developed microcomputer, following on from the company's role of marketing and selling the ACT Sirius 1, and was described as "the first 16-bit system to be Sirius-compatible, rather than IBM-compatible", indicating the influence that the Sirius 1 had in the United Kingdom at the time.

It achieved success in the United Kingdom, with reviewers noting the system's high resolution 800 × 400 display (for its time) and its trackball cable (later models used IR).

It used an Intel 8086 processor running at 4.77 MHz. A 8087 math co-processor was optional. The amount of memory was 256 kB, expandable to 768 kB. It came with a 9" green phosphor CRT display capable of a 80 × 25 character text mode or a 800 × 400 pixel graphical mode, and was equipped with two floppy disk drives and a keyboard with an integrated LCD.

The Apricot Xi was a similar computer released in 1984, with a hard drive instead of a second floppy drive.

== Software ==
The system was delivered with SuperCalc, and several system utilities, asynchronous communication, an emulator for IBM PC, Microsoft Basic-86, Basic Personal and ACT Manager (a GUI for MS-DOS). Optionally available were Microsoft Word, Multiplan, WordStar, dBase II, C-Pascal, UCSD Pascal, C, Fortran, COBOL and Basic Compiler 5.35.

There are 20 known commercial games for Apricot PC

Title	Publisher
AP004: MS-BASIC Games No. 1	TP Group
AP006: Games No. 2	TP Group
AP008: Games No. 3	TP Group
AP010: GW-BASIC Games No. 1	TP Group
AP016: Chess	TP Group
Cutthroats	Infocom, Inc.
Deadline	Infocom, Inc.
Enchanter	Infocom, Inc.
Infidel Model	Infocom, Inc.
Planetfall	Infocom, Inc.
Seastalker Model	Infocom, Inc.
Sorcerer	Infocom, Inc.
Starcross	Infocom, Inc.
Suspect	Infocom, Inc.
Suspended	Infocom, Inc.
The Hitchhiker’s Guide to the Galaxy	Infocom, Inc.
The Witness	Infocom, Inc.
Zork I - The Great Underground Empire	Infocom, Inc.
Zork II - The Wizard of Frobozz	Infocom, Inc.
Zork III - The Dungeon Master	Infocom, Inc.

== IBM PC compatibility ==
The manufacturer did not completely clone the IBM BIOS, so although it ran MS-DOS and CP/M-86, it was not IBM PC compatible as the underlying system BIOS and hardware was very different. An Intel 8089 I/O controller was used, instead of the Intel 8237 DMA chip used in IBM computers; the ROM was only a simple boot loader rather than a full BIOS; and there was no 640k barrier. The floppy disk format was "not quite compatible"; attempting to read an ordinary PC FAT floppy in an Apricot, or vice versa, would result in a scrambled directory listing with some files missing.

Due to this incompatibility, software (such as dBase III) designed for an IBM PC could cause the system to crash.

Apricot later offered the possibility of converting the computer into an IBM compatible PC by replacing the motherboard with one equipped with an Intel 80286 processor.

== Technical data ==
- Processor: Intel 8086 4.77 MHz. Socket for optional Intel 8087 co-processor.
- BIOS: 2 × EPROM containing the BIOS
- Memory: 256 kB RAM expandable to 768 kB on board.
- Storage: 2 × 3.5" floppy drives with 315 kB or 720 kB capacity
- DMA chip: Intel 8089
- Graphics: Comes with a green phosphor screen 9" that weights 1.9 kg. Can display one of these modes:
  - Text 80 × 25 (Characters of 10 × 16 pixels)
  - Text 132 × 50 (Characters of 6 × 8 pixels)
  - Graphics at 800 × 400 (Hitachi 46505 CRT controller chip - equivalent to a Motorola 6845, also used on the Victor 9000 computer)
- Mechanical Keyboard 101-key QWERTY, 8 function keys and 6 keys standard dynamic membrane with an LED to the left of each one to indicate they are active. An LCD with 40 × 2 characters is included, which can display the key assignment. Weighs 1.5 kg and can be attached to the frame underneath for easy transport.
- Housing: 42 × 32 × 10 cm plastic cream weighing about 6.4 kg The front half of the top shows a depression to bring the monitor. In the front two 3.5" floppy drives that can be protected with a shutter for transport. Under these, a carrying handle. At the rear two proprietary Apricot connector slots for expansion, parallel printer port of Centronics micro ribbon 36 pin connector type, serial port DB-25 connector, monitor connector and power supply with a switch.
- Support for two internal 3,5" Sony floppy disk drives
- Input / Output:
  - External monitor connector.
  - Parallel printer port, Centronics micro ribbon 36-pin connector
  - RS-232 serial port
  - Two expansion connectors or internal Apricot
- Operating system came with standard MS-DOS 2.11 and CP/M-86.
