= Zonbu =

Technology company

- Type: Private Startup
- Industry: PC
- Genre: Computer
- Founded: 2006
- Founder: Grégoire Gentil and Alain Rossmann
- Fate: Discontinued
- Headquarters: Palo Alto, California, USA
- Products: Zonbu Box and Subscription
- Website: Zonbu.com

Zonbu was a technology company that marketed a computing platform which combined a web-centric service, a small form factor PC, and an open source based software architecture.Zonbu was founded by Alain Rossmann (previously founder and CEO of Openwave) and Gregoire Gentil (previously co-founder of Twingo Systems).

== Hardware ==
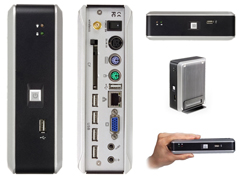
Zonbu Mini PC.

The first-generation Zonbox hardware was the eBox-4854 sold by DMP Electronics of Taiwan. Called the Zonbu Mini, it was a nettop computer measuring 6 3/4 in × 4 3/4 in × 2 1/4 in (171 mm × 121 mm × 57 mm). It is flash based, fanless, and thus effectively silent. The official specifications for the device in 2007 were: 1.2 GHz Via Eden CPU (C7 Esther core), 512 MB RAM, Ethernet over twisted pair 10/100 Mbit/s, PS/2 keyboard and mouse ports, VGA display port and 6 USB 2.0 ports, 4 GB CompactFlash local storage, and Graphics up to 2048 x 1536 with 16 million colors – hardware graphics and MPEG2 acceleration.

Disassembly by Zonbu owners has shown that the Zonbu includes options for internal expansion: Mini PCI slot (for an optional wireless card), IDE connector, with room in the case for a 2.5" hard drive, and serial and parallel ports.

== Service ==
The Zonbu subscription plans include online storage (using Amazon S3), automatic upgrades, online support and remote file access. The subscription service is promoted as reducing the hassle of typical computer maintenance tasks, such as hardware repair, software installation, updates and upgrades, and malicious software removal.

== Software architecture ==
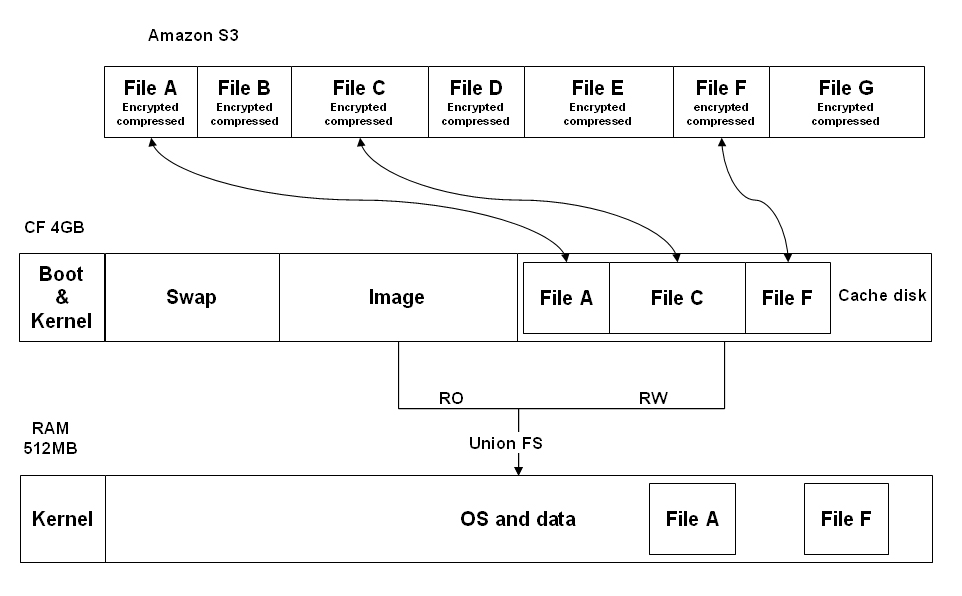
Zonbu disk architecture.

The Zonbu OS is a customized version of Linux based on the Gentoo distribution using the Xfce desktop environment. It is geared towards non-technical users, and the user interface focuses more on simplicity than advanced features.

The filesystem architecture combines a transparent overlay filesystem (pioneered by Linux Live Distributions) with an on-line backup service. User data is locally cached on Compact Flash Card, then transparently encrypted with 128-bit encryption and transferred to remote storage servers at Amazon S3.

== Applications ==
Zonbu comes pre-loaded with a number of software applications. These include the Firefox web browser, OpenOffice productivity suite and Skype IP phone service, and 30 casual games.

With the default OS, the user is not allowed to install any third-party software. The default set of applications is supposed to fit the needs of non-technical users or of a second home PC. However, Zonbu provides instructions to unlock the operating system and install additional software. The procedure is technical and intended for a minority of users (Standard for many linux users, unlocking GRUB, root, and install with emerge/portage).

== See also ==
- Everex, provider of the hardware used on some Zonbu models
- Linutop Linux PC
- OLPC laptop
- gOS
