= Chuck Peddle =

American electrical engineer (1937–2019)

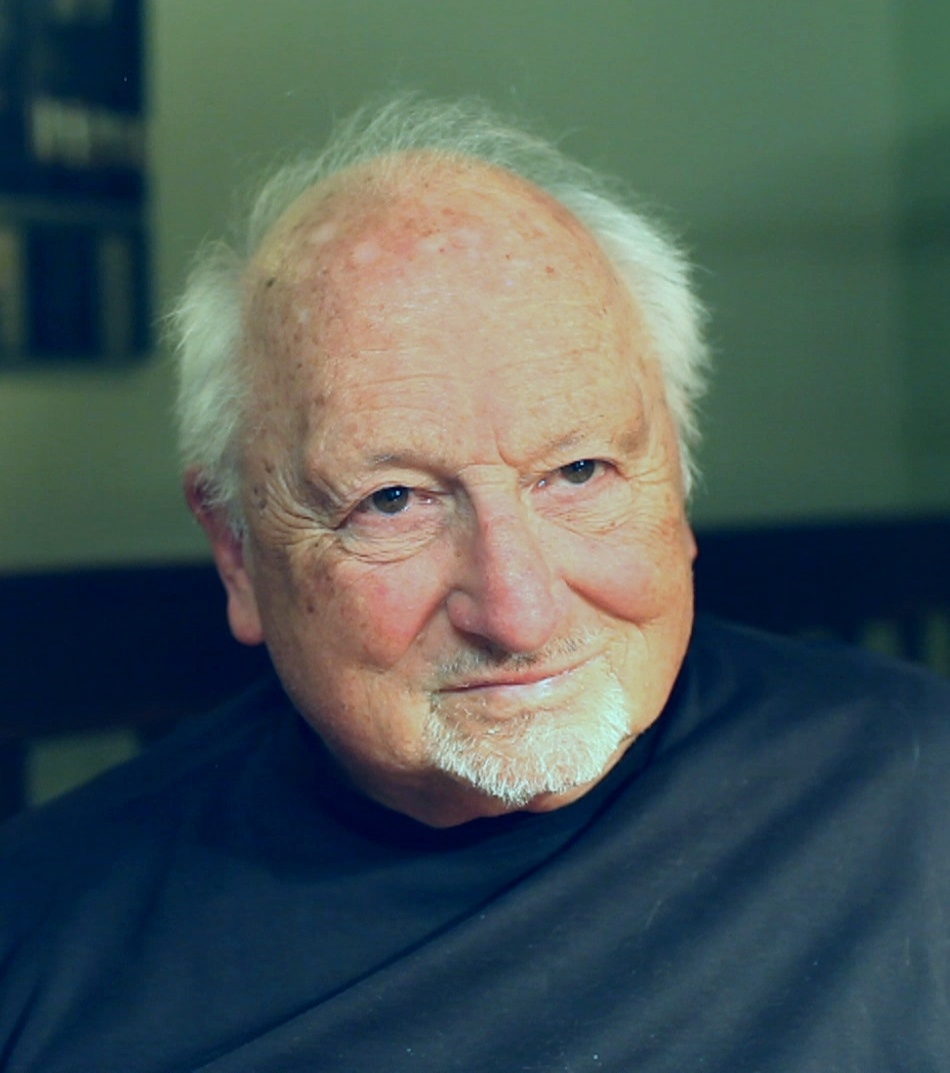
- Peddle in 2013
- Born: Charles Ingerham Peddle; November 25, 1937; Bangor, Maine, U.S.
- Died: December 15, 2019 (aged 82); Santa Cruz, California, U.S.
- Other name: Chuck Peddle
- Education: B.Sc.; University of Maine
- Occupation: Electrical engineer
- Years active: 1970–2015
- Known for: Personal computer pioneer; Sirius Systems Technology founder
- Notable work: 6502 microprocessor; KIM-1 single-board computer; Commodore PET

Charles "Chuck" Ingerham Peddle (November 25, 1937 – December 15, 2019) was an American electrical engineer best known as the main designer of the MOS Technology 6502 microprocessor and the Commodore PET personal computer, based on the 6502.

== Biography ==
Peddle was born in Bangor, Maine, United States on November 25, 1937. He worked in a radio station while in high school.

In 1955, Peddle joined the United States Marine Corps. He attended the University of Maine where he earned a Bachelor of Science (B.Sc.) degree in engineering physics. Afterward, he went to work for General Electric working with time-sharing systems.

In 1973, Peddle worked at Motorola on developing the 6800 processor.

Peddle recognized a market for a very low price microprocessor and began to champion such a design to complement the $300 Motorola 6800. His efforts were frustrated by Motorola management and he was told to drop the project. He then left for MOS Technology, where he headed the design of the 650x family of processors; these were made as a $25 answer to the Motorola 6800. The most famous member of the 650x series was the 6502, developed in 1975, which was priced at 15% of the cost of an Intel 8080, and was subsequently used in many commercial products, including the Apple II, PET, VIC-20, Atari 8-bit computers, arcade video games, Oric computers, and the BBC Micro. The Atari 2600 uses the closely related 6507 CPU, the Commodore 64 uses the also closely related derivative 6510, and the Nintendo Entertainment System uses a custom ASIC which includes an altered 6502 core (with the decimal mode deleted).

In 1980, Peddle left MOS Technology, together with Commodore Business Machines (CBM) financer Chris Fish, to found Sirius Systems Technology. There, Peddle designed the Sirius 1 / Victor 9000 8088-based personal computer.

== Legacy ==
Peddle, along with the 6502's co-designer Bill Mensch, are regarded as personal computer pioneers, in that both the 6502 technology and business model were instrumental in helping launch the personal computer revolution. After Peddle's death, Mensch wrote in memoriam (note the incorrect spelling of Commodore cofounder Jack Tramiel as 'Trammel').

== See also ==
- Group coded recording

== Bibliography ==
- Bagnall, Brian (2005). On the Edge, The Spectacular Rise and Fall of Commodore. Winnipeg: Variant Press. ISBN 0-9738649-0-7.
