= Sirius Systems Technology =

Personal computer manufacturer

- Type: Private
- Industry: Computers
- Founded: 1980; 46 years ago
- Founder: Chuck Peddle; Chris Fish
- Defunct: 1984

Sirius Systems Technology was a personal computer manufacturer in Scotts Valley, California. It was founded in 1980 by Chuck Peddle and Chris Fish, formerly of MOS Technology and capitalized by Walter Kidde Inc. In late 1982 Sirius acquired Victor Business Systems (known for its calculators and cash registers) from Kidde and changed its name to Victor Technologies. It made the Victor/Sirius series of personal computers. The company made a public stock offering in the first half of 1983, but went into Chapter 11 protection from bankruptcy before the end of 1984. The company's assets were acquired by Datatronic AB, a Swedish software/hardware distribution company headed by Mats Gabrielsson. Gabrielsson signed a distribution deal with Kyocera, which began to supply PC clones to Victor.

== Victor 9000 / Sirius 1 ==
Victor 9000
- Also known as: ACT Sirius 1
- Manufacturer: Applied Computer Techniques
- Type: Personal computer
- Released: Late 1981; 45 years ago
- Operating system: MS-DOS and CP/M-86
- CPU: 5 MHz @ Intel 8088 CPU
- Memory: 128 KB (Max 896 KB)
- Storage: Two 5 1/4-inch floppies (1.2 MB double-sided)
- Display: monochrome CRT
- Graphics: Hitachi 46505: Text mode 80 × 25 or graphics 800 × 400 pixels
- Sound: Voice coding using CVSD modulation, sampling rate of about 16 kHz
- Input: 94 key keyboard with numpad

The Victor 9000 (distributed in the UK by British company Applied Computer Techniques as the ACT Sirius 1, and in Australia by Barson Computers as the Sirius 1) was designed by Peddle, who had also designed the first Commodore PET. His team began work in January 1981 and showed a prototype in April. It appeared for the first time at the Systems show in Munich, Germany, in late 1981. Chuck Peddle used two of his Commodore contacts to set up two subsidiaries in continental Europe. David Deane (France) and Jürgen Tepper (Germany) were both ex-Mannesmann Tally whom Chuck had met while negotiating an OEM deal for printers.

The Victor 9000/Sirius 1 ran CP/M-86 and MS-DOS but did not claim to be IBM PC compatible. It offered a higher resolution screen and 600 KB/1.2 MB floppy drives. Advertisements cited the graphics, multiple operating systems, 128 KB of RAM, and high-quality audio. Audio was provided by a MC6852-SSDA chip and a CODEC supporting voice coding with CVSD modulation with a sampling rate of about 16 kHz.

The Victor 9000 graphic hardware, (based on a Hitachi 46505 CRT controller chip - equivalent to a Motorola 6845), was capable of displaying bitmap graphics in 800 × 400 resolution on a 12'' monochrome CRT, with a refresh rate of 76 Hz interlaced.

One notable difference between it and other machines on the market at the time was that the disc utilized a form of zoned constant linear velocity (ZCLV) (using 9 different speed-zones selected out of 15 supported by the hardware) with a variant of zone bit recording (ZBR) (11 to 19 sectors depending on zone) to spin at different speeds according to where the data was stored, running slower towards the outer edge of the disc in such a way that bit density (bits per cm passing the head), rather than rotational speed, was approximately constant. This, combined with group-coded recording (GCR), allowed standard floppy disks to hold more data than others at the time, 600 KB on single- and 1.2 MB on double-sided floppies compared with 140–160 KB per side of other machines such as the Apple II and early IBM PC, but this disk format was not compatible with machines with standard drives.

The Victor 9000's 800 × 400 resolution screen (based on a Hitachi 46505 CRT controller chip - equivalent to a Motorola 6845), 896 KB of RAM memory limit, programmable keyboard and character set were also far ahead of the competition.

While unsuccessful in North America, Victor 9000 for some time became the most popular 16-bit business computer in Europe, especially in Britain and Germany, while IBM delayed the release of the PC there. Its success led to the ACT Apricot. ACT outsold the Sirius/Victor subsidiaries and also led the way in proving that application software was the key to sales. Most sales across Europe went through small systems houses rather than computer shops.

The Victor 9000 was also distributed in the UK under that name by DRG Business Machines in Weston-super-Mare, who dealt with Victor Technologies in the US direct. It was not a particularly successful venture as ACT had already established a brand name and a loyal dealer base.

=== Reception ===
BYTE called the Victor 9000 "an excellent microcomputer with an outstanding array of standard features". It praised the high-quality video and large array of software available from Victor, while criticizing the high price of peripherals compared to the many third-party options on the IBM PC.
