= Astone UMPC =

Mini touch screen notebook

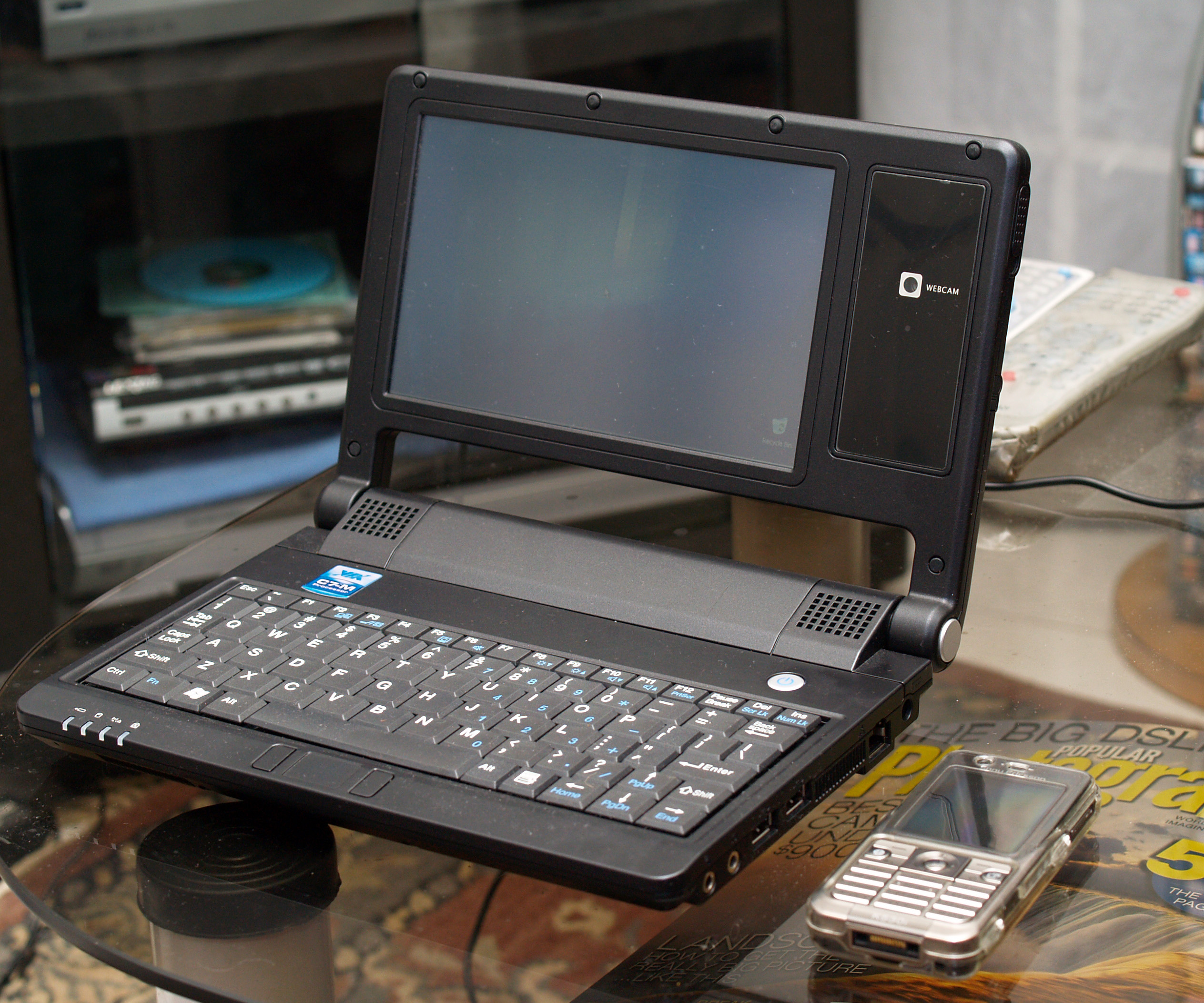
- An Astone UMPC with a mobile phone beside it to provide scale.
- Manufacturer: Astone
- Type: Netbook
- Media: 60 GB hard drive
- Operating system: Windows XP
- CPU: VIA C7-M ULV 1.2 GHz
- Memory: 1 GB
- Display: 18 cm (7″) WVGA TFT (800×480) on VIA UniChrome Pro IGP
- Input: Keyboard, touchpad VIA VT1708A audio
- Camera: 0.3 megapixel (640×480)
- Connectivity: WLAN 802.11b/g Ethernet 100 Mbit/s; DVI-I, two USB 2.0 ports Card reader (SD, MMC, MS (PRO))
- Power: Four-cell Li-ion battery (14.4 V, 2200 mAh)
- Dimensions: 230 x 171 x 29.4 mm
- Weight: 0.97 kg

Astone UMPC is a mini notebook manufactured by Astone and based in VIA NanoBook. It has a 7-inch (180 mm) LCD touch screen powered by a 1.2 GHz VIA C7-M processor. The module bay on the right side of the screen allows expansion with optional components such as webcam, GPS receiver, or world clock.

== Specifications ==
The hardware specification of the Astone UMPC are as follows:

- Processor: VIA C7-M ULV 1.2 GHz (FSB400)
- Graphics: integrated VX700
- Audio: VT1708A, with 2 internal 1.5W built-in speaker
- Monitor: 7″ LCD Touch Screen WVGA 800×480
- LAN: 10/100 Mbit/s LAN
- Wireless LAN: 802.11b/g
- Battery: 4-cell 2200mAh
- I/O: DVi-I, USB, Microphone, Headphone out/Line-out, RJ45
- Webcam: 0.3MP Camera
- Card Reader: 4-in-1 (SD, MMC, MS, MS Pro)
- Dimension: 230 x 171 x 29.4 mm
- Weight: 0.97 kg
- Memory: 1 GB DDR 667
- HDD: 60 GB (1.8″ HDD)
