= NanoBook =

2007 netbook computer

VIA NanoBook
- Manufacturer: VIA Technologies, Inc.
- Type: Subnotebook

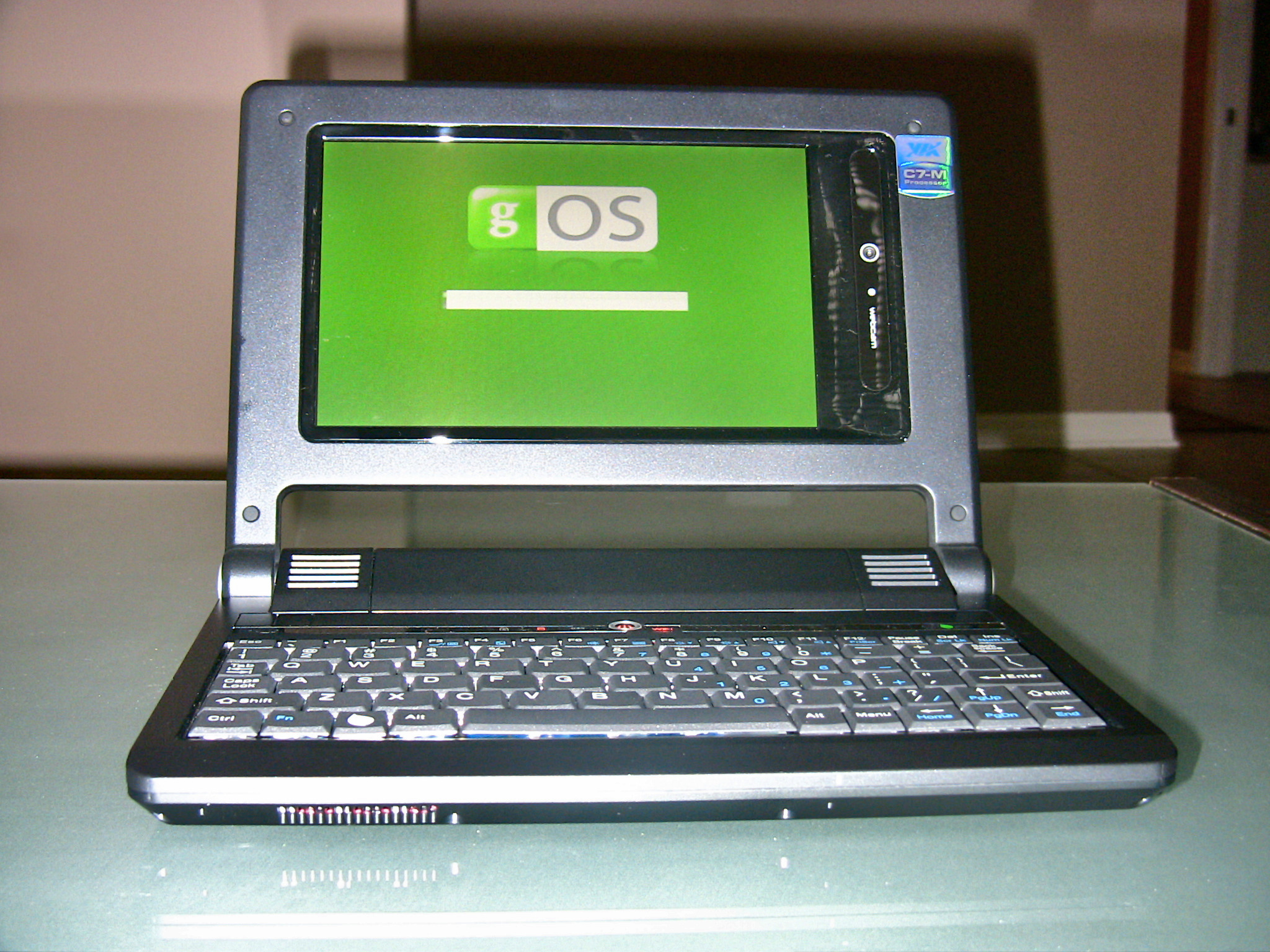
Everex's CloudBook is based on NanoBook design.

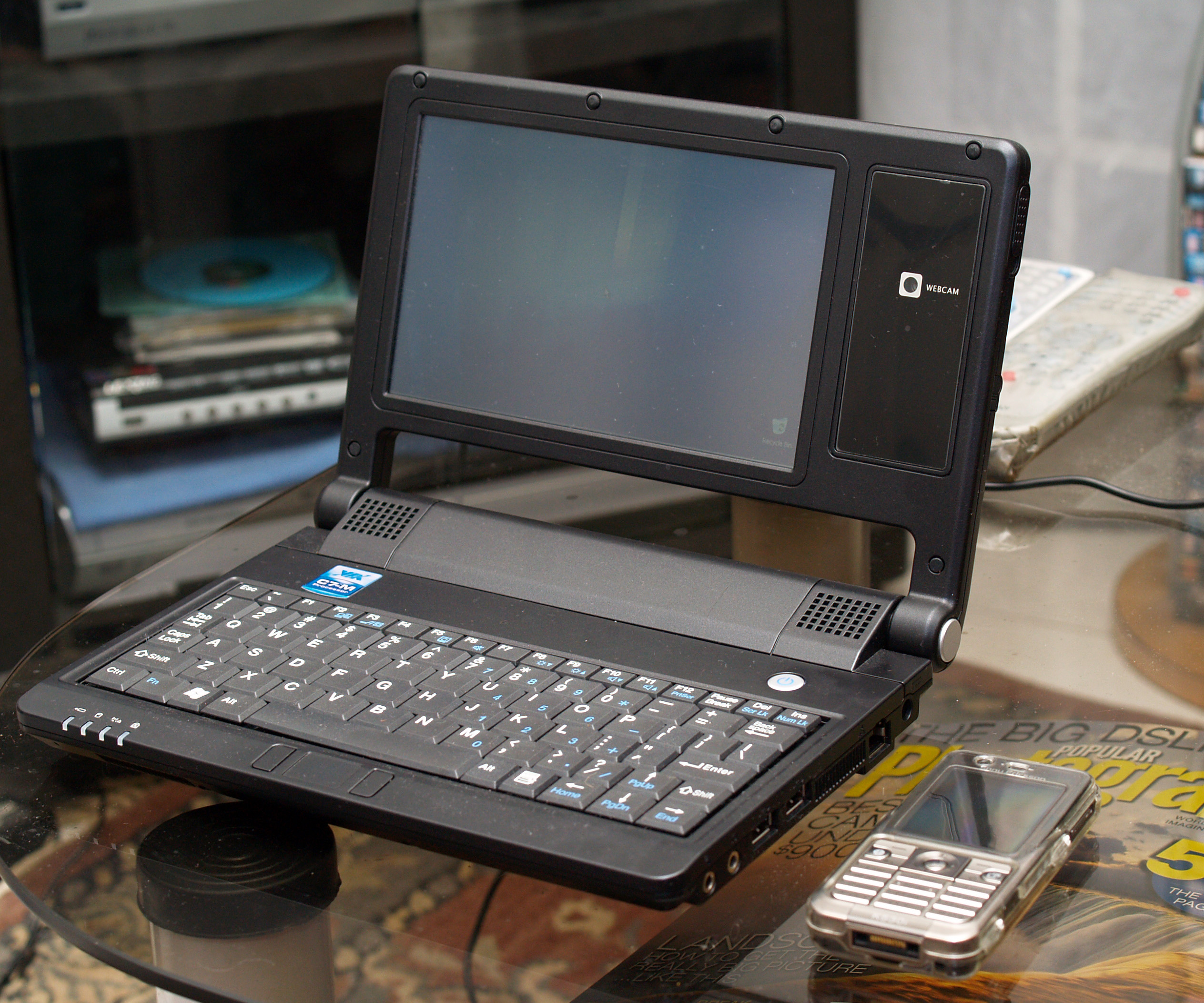
An Astone UMPC with a mobile phone beside it to provide scale.

The NanoBook is an ultra-mobile PC reference design by VIA Technologies, Inc. It has a clamshell form factor, a 7-inch 800×480 touchscreen display, and a full-size keyboard. It weighs less than 850g (approximately 1.87 lb) and has a claimed battery life that lasts to at least 4 hours. It is based on the VIA VX700 chipset, featuring the VIA UniChrome Pro II IGP integrated graphics and powered by the 1.2-GHz VIA C7-M ultra low voltage processor. It includes up to 1 GB DDR2 memory, a minimum 30-GB hard drive, 802.11g WiFi, Bluetooth and Ethernet support, as well as a 4-in-1 card reader, a DVI port and two USB 2.0 ports.

The company's press release stated that, "[to] provide users with additional flexibility when they are on the move, the VIA NanoBook also features a USB slot next to the screen that will enable the snap-in integration of a variety of World Time Clock/Calendar, GPS, VOIP, and broadband wireless modules."

The NanoBook was "targeted at aggressive consumer price points", and was available starting in the second half of 2007 through global OEMs and SIs.

== Specification ==
Overview of the VIA NanoBook UMD reference design specification from VIA's web site:

- Processor: 1.2 GHz VIA C7-M ULV (Ultra Low Voltage) Processor
- Chipset: VIA VX700 System Media Processor (integrated North & South Bridge)
- Memory: DDR2 SO-DIMM up to 1 GB
- 30-GB HDD
- Display: 7-inch 800×480 touchscreen TFT LCD
- Graphics: VIA UniChrome Pro II IGP Integrated 3D/2D Graphics with shared memory up to 64 MB
- Audio: VIA Vinyl VT1708A HD Audio codec; 2 speakers
- Networking:
  - Ethernet: Realtek RTL8100CL 10/100 Mbit/s
  - Wireless LAN: Azure Wave 802.11b/g (USB interface)
  - Bluetooth: Billionton (USB interface)
- I/O:
  - 4-in-1 Card Reader
  - 1× DVI-I port
  - 2× Hi-Speed USB2.0 ports
  - 1× RJ45 Ethernet port
  - Audio jacks:
    - 1× Mic-in audio jack
    - 1× Array Microphone jack
    - 1× Headphone (line out) jack
- Status Indicator: Power On; Battery; RF (with power button); HDD; Caps Lock
- Battery: 4 cells for up to 4.5 hours of battery life (BatteryMark 2004)
- Dimensions: 230 mm (W) × 171 mm (D) × 29.4 mm (H)
- Weight: Under 850 g
- Operating System Support: Supports Microsoft Windows XP, Windows Vista and all popular Linux distributions

== Netbooks Nanobook-based ==
- Apricot Picobook Pro
- Aristo Pico 740
- Astone UMPC CE-260
- Belinea s.book 1
- Blue Thunder BT260
- Elonex Websurfer
- Everex CloudBook
  - Everex Cloudbook CE1200V
  - Everex Cloudbook CE1201V
  - Everex Cloudbook SC1200T
  - Everex Cloudbook CE1200J
- iDOT CE260
- Packard Bell Easynote XS
- Pioneer Dreambook Light CE26
- Sungju TangoX Nano
- Surcouf La Révolution
- Sylvania g
- Zyrex Ubud

== See also ==
- ASUS Eee PC
- Palm Foleo
- Ultra-Mobile PC
- VIA OpenBook
