= Everex =

American computer manufacturer

Everex Systems, Inc.
- Type: Subsidiary of NewMarket Technology, Inc.
- Industry: Computer hardware Diversified Electronics
- Founded: 1983
- Headquarters: Fremont, California, U.S.
- Key people: John Lin; (General Manager); Paul C. Kim; (Director of Marketing)
- Products: Multi-Processor Servers, Notebook, Desktop, and Ultra Mobile personal computers including the eXplora, IMPACT, StepNote, gPC and CloudBook branded product lines
- Number of employees: 900
- Website: www.everex.com

Everex Systems, Inc., is a defunct American manufacturer of multi-processor servers, desktop and notebook personal computers. It was established in 1983 and headquartered in Fremont, California. The company was founded by Steve Hui, John Lee and Wayne Cheung. In 1988, Everex was the leader in tape backup sales with half of the world market. On January 5, 1993 the company filed for bankruptcy and was purchased by Formosa Plastics Group, hence becoming part of a multinational conglomerate alongside companies like First International Computer, the world's leading motherboard manufacturer. On December 29, 2006 Everex Systems, Inc filed a voluntary petition for liquidation under Chapter 7, and in June 2008 NewMarket Technology has taken control of Everex.

== History ==
Everex Systems logo used from the 1980s to the late 2000s

In 1983, Everex shipped its first hard drive, tape backup and graphics products. Seven years later, with an ever expanding product line, annual revenues totaled over $436 million and the workforce topped 2,200 employees. In 1985, Everex began shipping personal computers under private labels, such as the popular IBM-AT-compatible System 1800. Three years later the STEP computer line launched, introducing cutting edge 286 and 386-based computing to a mass audience. In addition to computer systems, high-performance file servers and a UNIX-based operating system (ESIX), the company produced tape drives, graphics boards, data and fax modems, network boards, memory enhancement and desktop publishing products, controllers for disk and tape drivers, and monitors.

- 1983 - Everex founded in Fremont, California
- 1984 - First Everex hard disk drive shipped
- 1986 - 286-based STEP line of computers launched
- 1987 - Everex IPO under NASDAQ "EVRX"
- 1992 - Discussed a merger with Northgate Computer Systems but these talks failed.
- 1993 - Everex files for Chapter 11 bankruptcy protection. They sell their Esix brand to James River Group for $210,000 and their storage division to Exabyte for $5.5M.
- 1993 - Everex purchased by the Formosa Plastics Group
- 1998 - Everex launches FreeStyle, the world's first Windows CE PDA, but abandoned the line later in the year
- 2007 - Everex launches its first 17" widescreen Vista notebook
- 2007 - Everex launches low-cost green PC Impact GC3502 running gOS
- 2007 - Everex announces plans for sub-$300 Linux notebooks
- 2008 - Everex launches a series of low cost "green" systems, the CloudBook UMPC, the gBook notebook, and the gPC mini Mac mini-like desktop, all running the Ubuntu-based gOS Linux with the GNOME desktop environment. Everex is later acquired by systems integrator Newmarket Technology.
- 2009 - The US subsidiary of Everex closes its doors, while the Japanese and Taiwanese subsidiaries seem to remain unaffected.

== Green computers ==
In the mid-2000s, Everex began selling several brands of green computers.

=== gBook ===
The gBook is a webbook, a laptop with a 15.4" WXGA+ Widescreen Display (1440 x 900) and a 1.5 GHz VIA C7-M Processor. It comes loaded with gOS Linux.

=== gPC ===
Two major variants of the gPC exist: one based on gOS Linux; the other, an Impact brand of Windows Vista low-power machines. Both utilize a VIA C7 CPU. The gPC also ships with a softmodem that is not enabled for consumer use, but is provided "for developers." A successor, gPC2, was available through Wal-Mart. A third, the gPC3, with a 2 GHz AMD Sempron processor, 1 GB RAM, and Ubuntu 8.04, was available through Newegg.

=== gPC mini ===
The gPC mini, a small, light nettop computer, was announced in April 2008: it includes a DVD recorder, DVI video output, and MySpace-driven content on gOS Space. It was intended as a competitor to the Mac mini.

=== Cloudbook ===
The Cloudbook is an Ultra-Mobile PC, running a VIA C7 CPU with either gOS Linux or Windows Vista. There is also a Stepnote variant that uses a Pentium Dual-Core CPU, instead of a VIA C7.

=== Photos ===
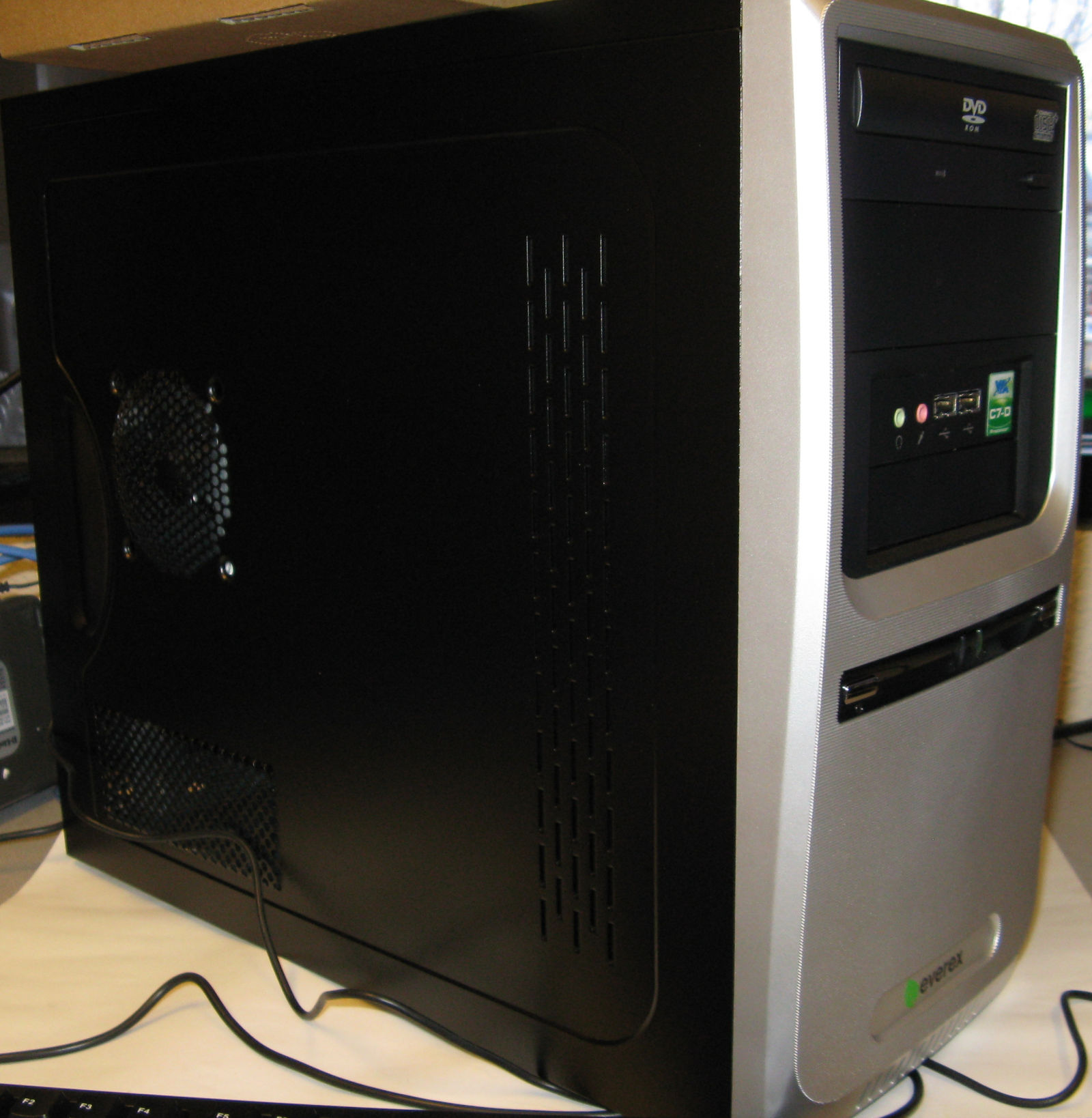
Casing of a gPC from 2008.

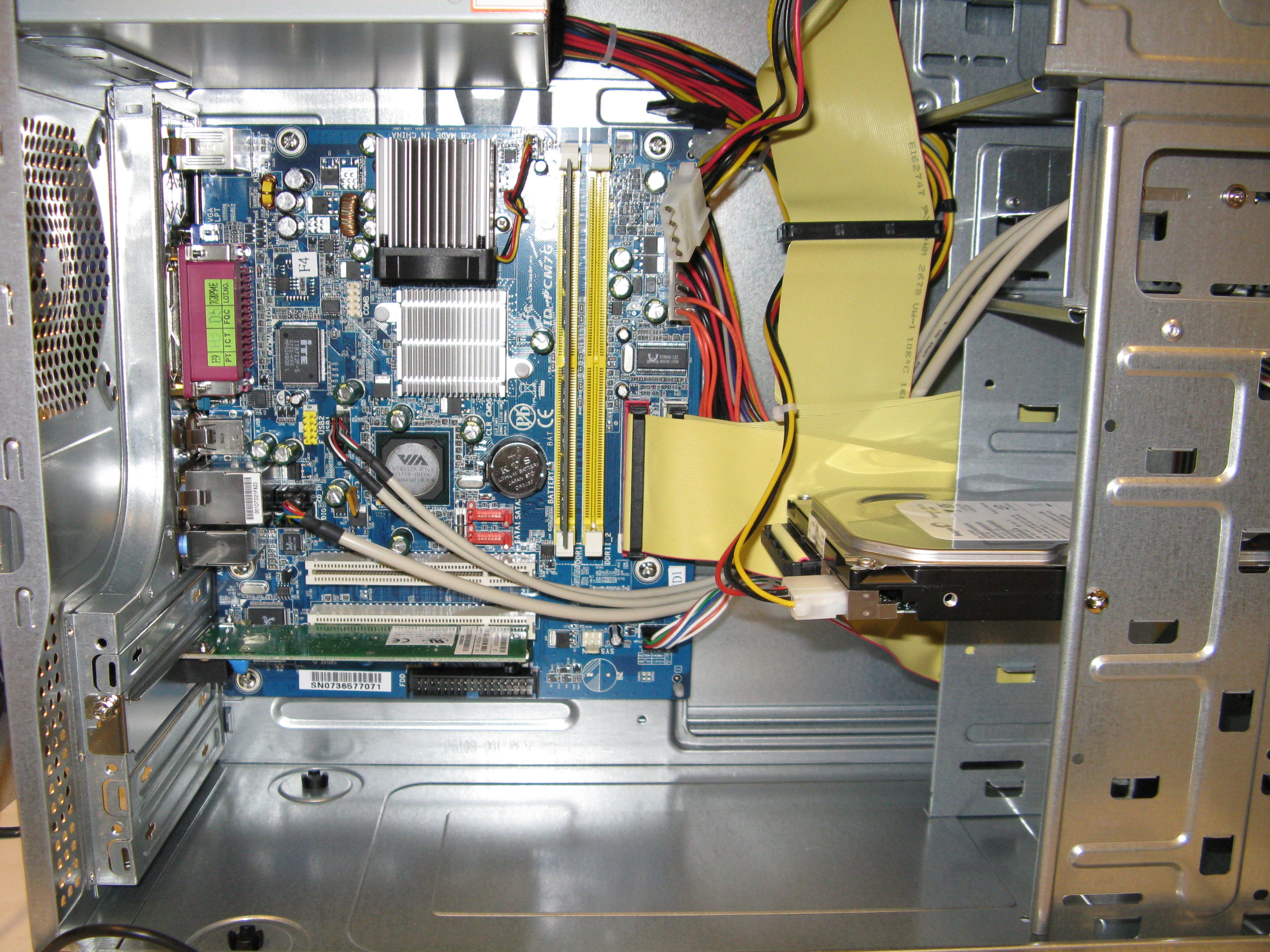
Interior of a gPC from 2008.

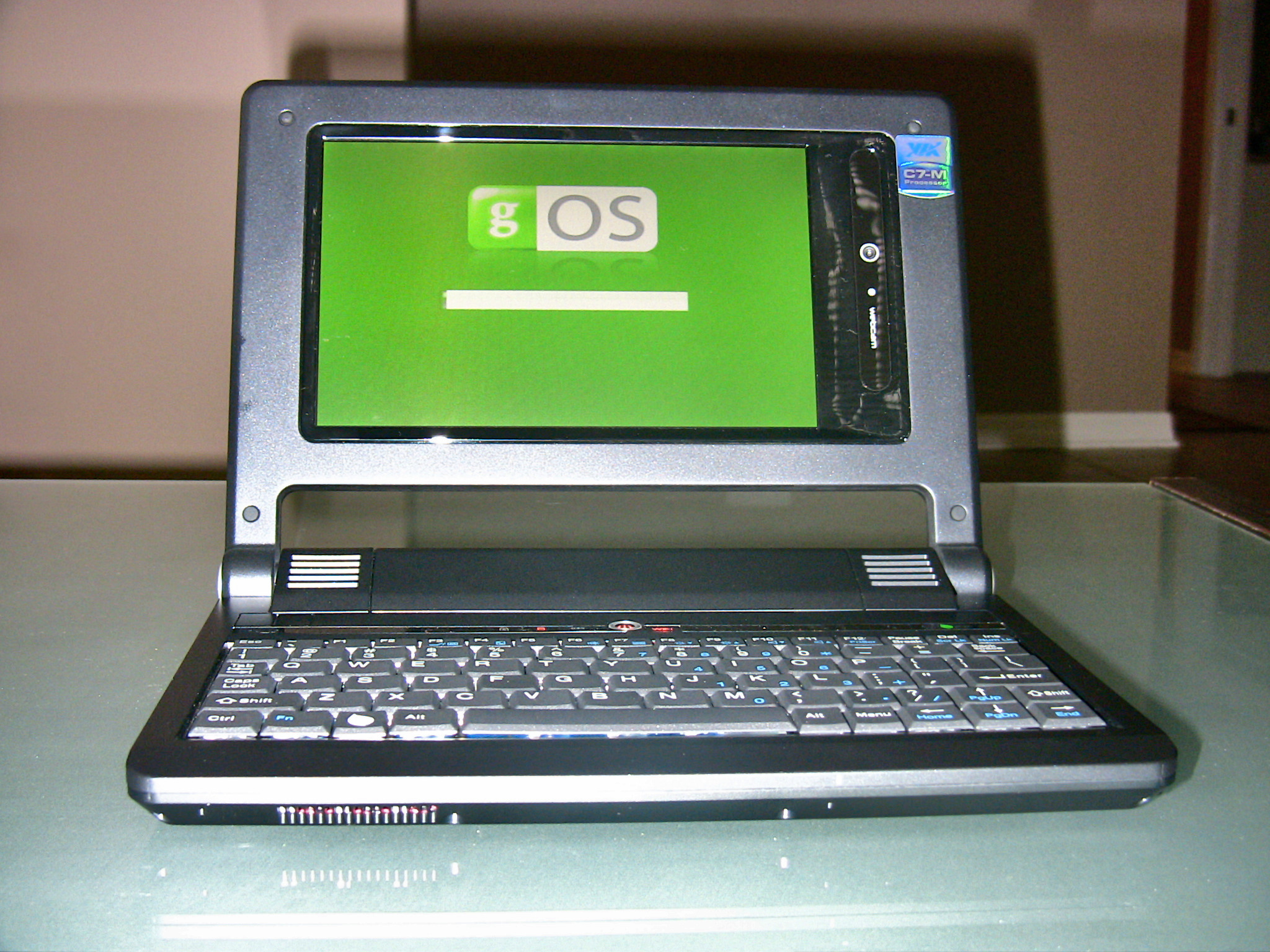
CloudBook

== See also ==
- First International Computer (FIC)
- Zonbu, some of whose computers are based on Everex hardware
