= PC Club =

American computer hardware store

- Type: Private retail
- Industry: Computer hardware
- Founded: 1992
- Defunct: 2008
- Fate: Bankruptcy
- Headquarters: City of Industry, CA
- Key people: Chris Chen, CEO (as of 2008)
- Products: Desktops; Laptops; Peripherals
- Services: In-store computer repairs & upgrades
- Number of employees: 230 (1998)

PC Club was a privately owned, United States–based chain of computer hardware stores established in City of Industry, California, in 1992. The company closed all its stores on July 29, 2008. PC Club operated primarily in the West Coast states. It offered hardware and peripherals for PCs, as well as complete desktop and notebook computers assembled under the "Enpower" brand name.

== History ==
Taiwanese businessman Jackson Lan founded PC Club in 1992 as its first CEO. Following Lan's death in 2005, the company went through turbulent times. Jeff Lan, Jackson's brother, was appointed president of the company in January 2006. On April 8, 2008, Jeff Lan was appointed advisor to a new PC Club chairman, James Cheng, while Sunny Lin was named the company's next president. However, in May 2008, all its brick-and-mortar stores were closed in addition to the company's e-commerce website (clubit.com) during another ownership transfer to NAOC. On May 16, the stores and website were reopened after the company was acquired for an undisclosed amount by NAOC Holdings, a leveraged buyout holding company.

On July 23, 2008, PC Club closed 14 of its locations. Less than a week later, on July 29, the store shut down the remainder of its locations.

== Business model ==
PC Club sold directly to both consumers and local resellers through its brick-and-mortar stores and via its website. At one point, they had over 60 store locations in 12 different states, typically placed within walking distance of CompUSA, Best Buy or Fry's Electronics. It provided live tech support by phone, maintained an online forum, and answered questions through e-mail. In-store repairs and upgrades were available at all locations.

== Marketing ==
PC Club promoted itself through mainstream advertising and word of mouth. PC Club also had TV commercials in limited areas.
