= Apricot Picobook Pro =

Picobook Pro
- Developer: Apricot Computers
- Type: Netbook
- Released: October 15, 2008
- Operating system: Windows XP Home Edition; SUSE Linux
- CPU: VIA C7-M ULV
- Website: Apricot – Picobook Pro

The Apricot Picobook Pro is the first product of the reformed Apricot Computers. It is a netbook based on the VIA NanoBook, first shown to the press on October 15 2008.

== Specifications ==
- CPU: VIA C7-M ULV at 1.2 GHz.
- Chipset: VIA VX800 System Media Processor (Northbridge and Southbridge integrated).
- Monitor: TFT 8.9 inch, 1024x600 pixels. Support to internal/external/dual monitor, or TV.
- Graphics: 3D/2D S3 Graphics Chrome9 HC3 chipset integrated, shared VRAM to a max of 64 MB; DirectX 9.0. and HD video support.
- RAM: 1 GB of SO-DIMM DDR2 RAM at 667 MHz.
- Dimensions: 230 x 171 x 38.7 mm
- Weight: 0.98 kg (2.16 lb).
- Ports: On the left, VGA DE-15 and one USB 2.0 port. On the right, a second USB port, Kensington Security Slot, 8P8C and power supply. In the front, two minijack (mic/ear) and 4 in 1 Card-reader. Open, integrated Webcam of 1.3 megapixels over the TFT, keyboard and touchpad at bottom.
- Keyboard: QWERTY, 80 keys
- Hard disk 60 GB
- Sound card: VIA Vinyl VT1708A HD Audio codec. Up to 8 HD channels. 192 kHz sampling rate
- Connectivity
  - Ethernet: Realtek RTL8101E 10/100 Mbit/s
  - Wi-Fi: Realtek RTL8187SE 802.11 a/b/g
  - Bluetooth
  - WiMAX: optional
- Input/Output :
  - 4 in 1 Card-reader.
  - 1 VGA DE-15
  - 2 USB 2.0
  - 1 8P8C Ethernet
  - Audio connectors:
    - 1 minijack for microphone
    - 1 minijack line out
- Battery : 4400mA Lithium-ion battery, 2200 mA, four cells, up to 4 hours use.
- Power International auto-sensing adapter 110-240 V
- Operating system: Microsoft Windows XP Home (Nanobook Pro VX) or Novell SUSE Linux

== Reception ==
The Apricot was very poorly received. A review by PC Pro in 2009 awarded it two stars, the worst marks of the notebooks on test in the categories of build quality, speaker quality, keyboard and cursor quality, and screen quality, and advised readers to avoid it at all costs. A "first look" review by IT Pro in 2008 also awarded it two stars, calling it unattractive, with a dubious build quality, and all but impossible to type on.
