= Akira Takeuchi (fashion designer) =

Japanese fashion designer (born 1977)

- 竹内 彰
- Born: 1977 (age 48–49); Nagasaki Prefecture, Japan
- Education: ESMOD Tokyo
- Occupation: Fashion designer

Akira Takeuchi (Japanese: 竹内 彰; born 1977, Nagasaki Prefecture) is a Japanese fashion designer. Along with Tayuka Nakanishi, he is the main designer of the Theatre Products fashion brand, which is popular in the Harajuku and Shibuya areas of Tokyo, known as centers of youth fashion.

== Early life ==
Takeuchi graduated from ESMOD Tokyo. After graduation he worked at Sanei International, where he worked on projects such as Vivienne Tam.
