= Wonder Boy (2019 film) =

- French: Wonder Boy: Olivier Rousteing, né sous X
- Directed by: Anissa Bonnefont
- Produced by: Anissa Bonnefont
- Starring: Olivier Rousteing
- Cinematography: Thomas Brémond
- Edited by: Guerric Catala
- Music by: Yndi Ferreira Da Silva
- Production companies: Stella Maris Pictures; Box Fish Productions; Sultan Pictures; Canal+
- Release dates: 16 October 2019 (Canal+); 27 November 2019 (France)
- Running time: 83 minutes
- Country: France
- Language: French

Wonder Boy (French: Wonder Boy, Olivier Rousteing, né sous X, transl. Wonder boy, Olivier Rousteing, parents unknown) is a 2019 French documentary film directed by Anissa Bonnefont covering the personal and professional life of Olivier Rousteing, the creative director of Balmain, as he searches for his biological parents. The film was first shown on the television channel Canal+ on 16 October 2019 and was released in French theatres on 27 November.

== Production ==
Anissa Bonnefont first met Olivier Rousteing when he bought a residence from her mother, where they bonded over their experiences with parent abandonment as children. Bonnefont encouraged Rousteing to search for his biological parents, which he had earlier hesitated to do, and persuaded Balmain to allow her to make a film on the search with certain terms: "no posing" from Rousteing, full access to Balmain, and control over the final cut. She financed the production cost herself, raising €1.1 million (US$1.2 million) of funds from a variety of sources, including the French government. Balmain assisted with the licensing fees for the soundtrack during post production. Filming began in 2017 and took around one-and-a-half years to complete; Bonnefont stated that the relationship between her and Rousteing "became like brother and sister" during production.

== Release and reception ==
After test showings and a private screening for Balmain shareholders in June 2019, the film was broadcast on the television channel Canal+ on 16 October before being released in French theatres on 27 November. It was made available for streaming internationally on Netflix on 26 June 2021.

Reception of the film was positive, with critics praising the "peek behind the curtain" into Rousteing's emotions and loneliness behind the public image of his life.

Wonder Boy was nominated for the César Award for Best Documentary Film at the 45th César Awards, ultimately losing to Yolande Zauberman's M.
