= Hervé Pierre =

Hervé Pierre may refer to:

- Hervé Pierre (actor) (born 1955), French actor and theatre director
- Hervé Pierre (designer) (born 1965), French-American fashion and costume designer
