= HP 2133 Mini-Note PC =

Netbook computer running Linux or Windows

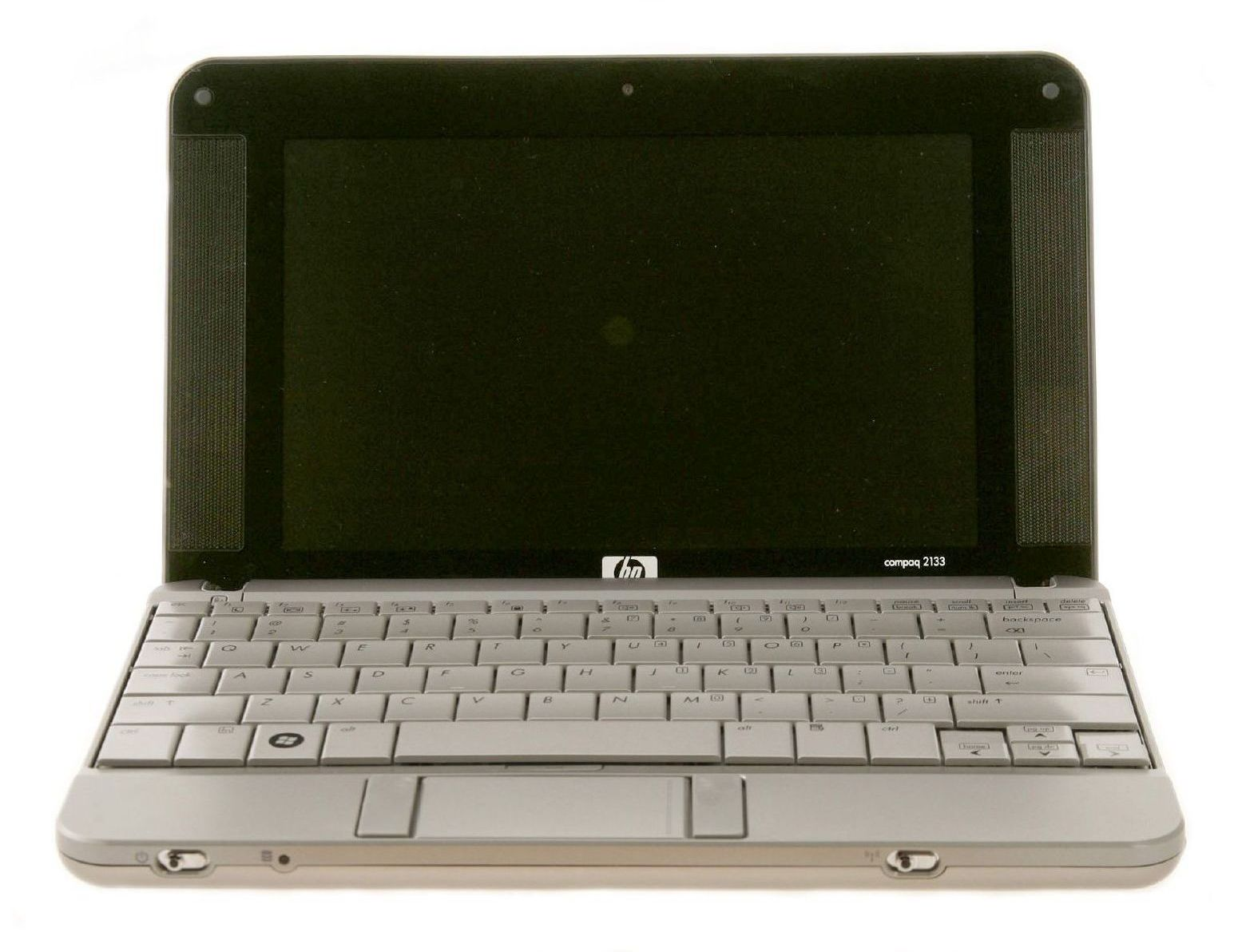
- Manufacturer: HP
- Type: Subnotebook/netbook
- Released: 15 April 2008
- Media: SD/SDHC/MMC card reader
- Operating system: SUSE Linux Enterprise Desktop, Windows XP, Windows Vista
- CPU: VIA C7-M ULV (1.0, 1.2 and 1.6 GHz)
- Memory: Single 512–2048 MB 667 MHz DDR2 SDRAM SODIMM
- Storage: 4GB SSD, 2.5in 120GB 5200RPM or 160GB 7200RPM HDD
- Display: 8.9in (diagonal) WXGA (1280 x 768) LCD with CCFL backlight or WSVGA (1024 x 600) LCD with LED backlight, VIA Chrome 9 graphics chip (64 – 256 MB shared memory)
- Sound: HD stereo audio, 2W stereo speakers
- Input: Keyboard; Touchpad; Stereo microphone
- Camera: VGA in screen bezel
- Touchpad: Wide format touchpad with side mounted buttons, scroll area and enable/disable button
- Connectivity: WLAN 802.11 a/b/g/n (Broadcom 4322AGN) or 802.11 a/b/g (Broadcom 4311AG); Ethernet 10/100/1000 Mbit/s; VGA; Bluetooth 2.0; USB 2.0; ExpressCard 54 slot 3.5mm microphone and headphone jacks
- Power: 3-cell (28 WHr) or 6-cell (55 WHr) high-capacity lithium-ion battery
- Dimensions: 255 x 165 x 27 mm (10.04 x 6.5 x 1.05 in)
- Weight: 1.27 kg (2.8 lb)
- Predecessor: First of its kind from HP
- Successor: HP Mini 2140
- Related: HP Mini 1000

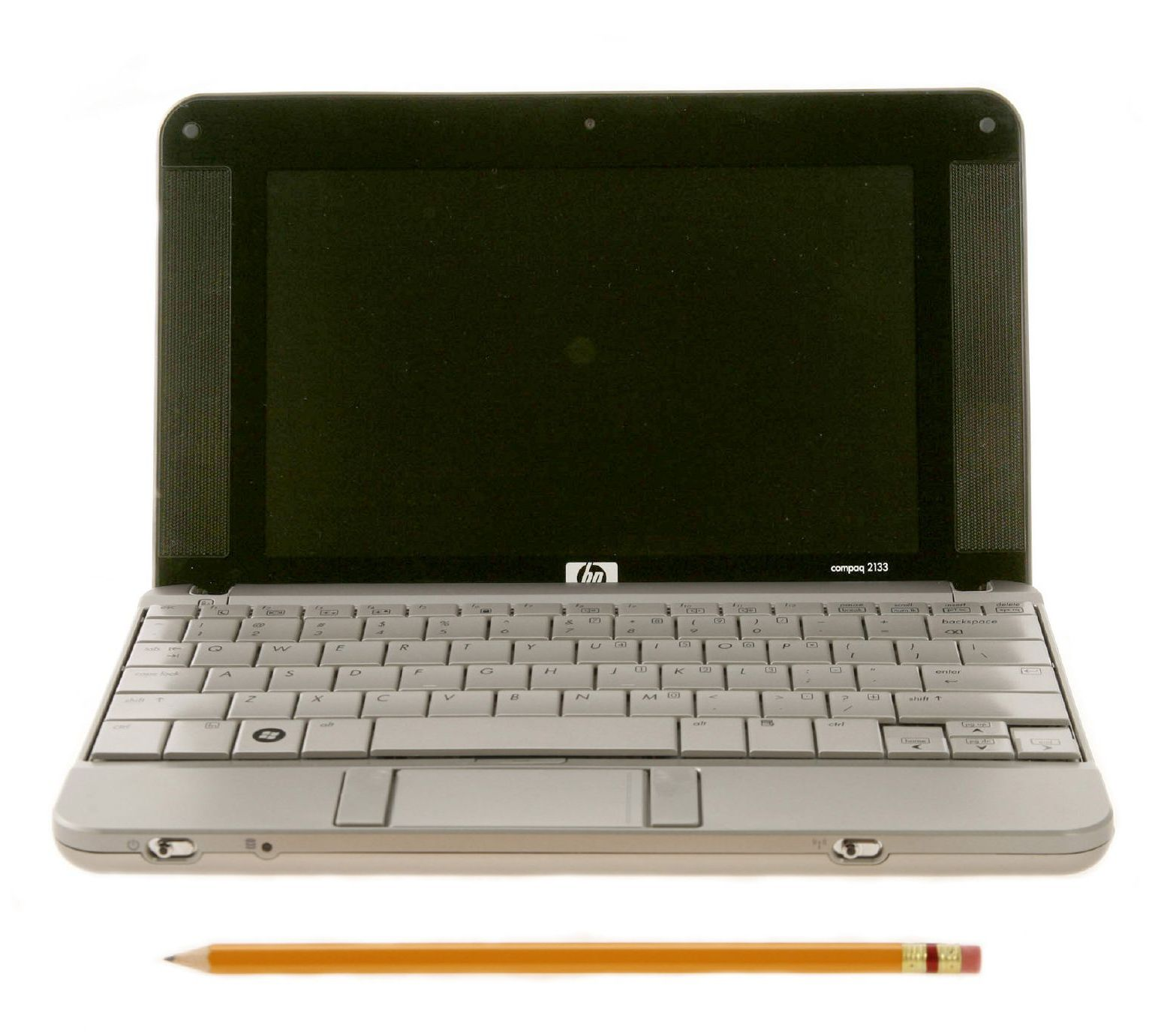
HP 2133 Mini-Note PC (front view compare with pencil)

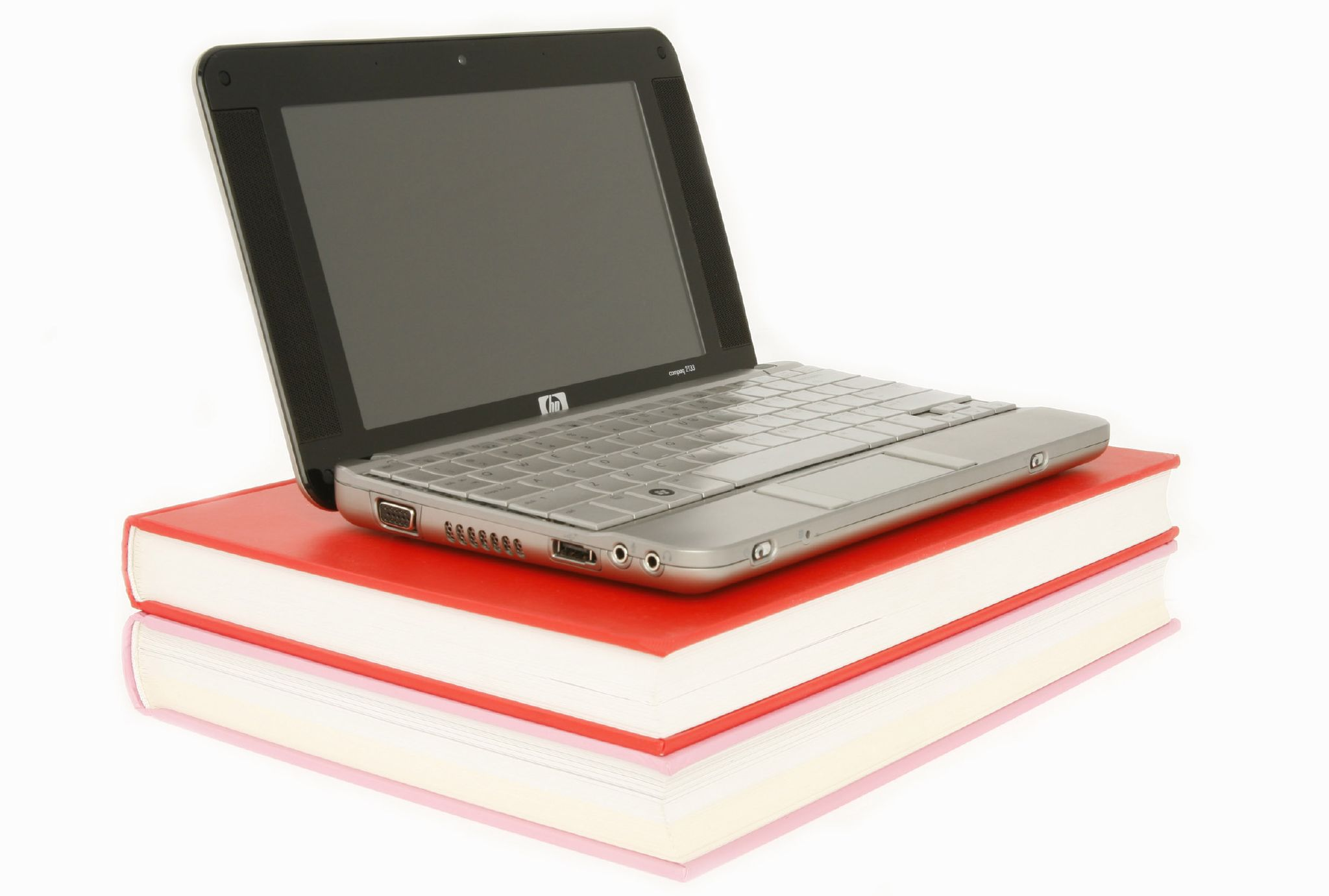
HP 2133 Mini-Note PC (side)

The HP 2133 Mini-Note PC is a full-function netbook made by HP that was aimed at the business and education markets. It was available with SUSE Linux Enterprise Desktop 10, Windows Vista or Windows XP. Its retail price started at US$499 for the Linux version with 4GB of flash memory. According to DigiTimes, the netbook was manufactured by Inventec. However, according to APC magazine, it was built by Compal Electronics who also made the MSI Wind and the Dell Inspiron Mini 9. The system was replaced in early 2009 by an upgraded model, the HP Mini 2140, which was also aimed at the education and business market.

== Features ==
The machine has a spill-resistant 92%-of-full-size keyboard which Hewlett-Packard has said is specially coated to reduce wear on the keys. Unusually, the touchpad buttons are to the sides of the pad itself, rather than below it. There is a small button above the touchpad to enable/disable the pad and buttons. The machine's shell is aluminium, while the inner chassis is anodised magnesium. The screen is protected by a layer of PMMA ("plexiglass"). The system has an accelerometer-based hard drive shock protection feature called "HP 3D DriveGuard".

As of October 2008, the HP 2133 is one of the few netbooks to feature an ExpressCard/54 slot, other ones being the Lenovo IdeaPad S9, Lenovo IdeaPad S10, NTT Corrino W 100I and the Gigabyte M912. The machine is available with a three- or six-cell battery, which provides approximately two and four hours of run time respectively on the high-end Windows Vista Business configuration shipped to reviewers. The larger battery projects downwards out of the rear of the machine, tilting it upwards – some reviewers have commented that this improves keyboard ergonomics.

A variety of CPU, RAM and mass storage configurations are available, and Bluetooth is available on high-end models. All of the current configurations of the machine feature a webcam, however in HP's press release it is listed as an optional feature. Operating systems available range from SuSE Linux to Microsoft Windows Vista Home and Business. Though the machine qualifies for Microsoft's "downgrade program", allowing units to be shipped with Windows XP Professional and with the option to upgrade to Windows Vista Business in future, this comes with the expectation that the customers order at least 25 units per year.

== Reception ==
Reviewers have been impressed by the notebook's comfortable keyboard, the high-resolution display, aesthetic design and overall build quality.

However, the unusual touchpad, with buttons placed at its sides, caused some usability issues for some users. The high reflectivity of the screen also caused difficulties in operating the netbook in bright environments. Performance was also cause for concern, with neither speed nor battery life particularly impressing reviewers.

Review machines also became hot in places on the underside of the chassis. In many revisions of the notebook, the fan vent had an additional dense plastic grill which impeded airflow greatly. The heat problem could mostly be eliminated by removing this inner grill, additional grills behind the air intake vents, replacing the thermal compound between the heatsink, the CPU and GPU with a higher quality type and reducing the CPU clock speed in software. As of September, 2010, the previous two years have seen a significant number of system board failures rendering the unit useless. At some point, when the unit is turned on, while the power light will illuminate, there is no other activity and no boot activity. Several owners have been successful in restoring functionality after removing the system board and heating it with a heat gun or "baking it" in an oven for a limited time. A web search for problems with the 2133 returns a large number of links to forums and discussions regarding the problem.

Several of these reviewers hoped that the machine's performance would be improved by a CPU update, to a next-generation VIA Nano, or perhaps the Intel Atom. HP notebook product marketing manager Robert Baker remarked that the decision to launch the machine with current-generation processors was driven by the education market's purchasing schedule, and that they would consider new CPUs for an "interim refresh" about six months into the machine's life.

== Similar products from HP ==
A new HP notebook similar in appearance to the Mini-Note, called the "Digital Clutch", was unveiled in October 2008, with a launch expected for December that year. The small pink computer is a collaboration with fashion designer Vivienne Tam, and has a 10-inch screen, a 1.6 GHz Intel Atom processor, 1 GB of RAM, and an 80 GB hard disk drive. A few days later, a black notebook of otherwise similar appearance called the "HP Mini 1000" was informally revealed by a banner on the company's store, and officially announced on 29 October 2008. Unlike the 2133, this device is meant for the home market.

An upgrade to the 2133, the HP Mini 2140, was announced by HP in January 2009.
