= Olivier Rousteing =

French fashion designer (born 1985)

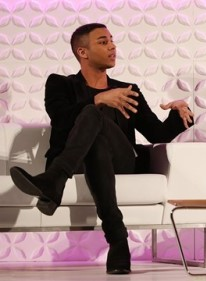
- Rousteing in 2016
- Born: 13 September 1985 (age 41); Bordeaux, France
- Occupation: Fashion designer
- Years active: 2003–present

Olivier Rousteing (French: [ɔlivje ʁustɛ̃]; born 13 September 1985) is a French fashion designer. He was the creative director of Balmain from 2011 to 2025.

== Early life and education ==
Rousteing was born in Bordeaux and adopted by his parents at the age of one. His mother is an optician, while his father is a seaport manager. He grew up in Bordeaux and moved to Paris to study at ESMOD (Ecole Supérieure des Arts et Techniques de la Mode). Like Jacquemus, he dropped out in his first year citing lack of creative freedom.

== Career ==
=== Early beginnings ===
In 2003, Rousteing began his career at Roberto Cavalli, where he was promoted to creative director of the Italian label's women's ready-to-wear collection, serving for five years in that position.

=== Balmain, 2009–2025 ===
Rousteing joined Balmain in 2009. During his early time at Balmain he worked closely with Christophe Decarnin, the then French fashion house's creative director.

On 26 April 2011, at 25 years old, Rousteing replaced Decarnin as the creative director of Balmain. While he liked Decarnin's aesthetic, he wanted to orient the label towards the finer aspects of French couture. At the time of his appointment, Rousteing was a relatively unknown designer, and brought a much-needed fresh take on the brand's aesthetic that remains to this day. He has been credited with adding an Asian influence to the clothing, as Asia comprises a huge part of the brand's buyers. Rousteing says his age, initial anonymity, and especially race led to grumblings amongst the fashion establishment. "People were like, 'Oh my God, he's a minority taking over a French house!'" Rousteing told Out magazine in 2015.

Since his arrival, menswear now accounts for 40 percent of Balmain's revenue. While the company did not release figures, it was estimated that Balmain's revenue increased 15 to 20 percent between 2012 and 2015. Rousteing opened a Balmain store in London, Balmain's first stand-alone boutique outside of Paris. A New York City store opened in SoHo in April 2016. Other stores are in the planning stage.

With the help of celebrity friends like Kim Kardashian, Kelly Rowland, Jennifer Lopez, Rihanna, Björk, Beyoncé, Justin Bieber, Nicki Minaj, Chris Brown, EMFAM and various models, including those from Victoria's Secret, Rousteing helped Balmain become the first French label to surpass one million followers on Instagram.

In 2022, Rousteing signed with the Creative Artists Agency "to explore new business-building opportunities in entertainment and popular culture that are complementary to his role as Balmain creative director."

On 5 November 2025, Rousteing announced his departure from Balmain, after 14 years as creative director.

=== Rabbane, 2026–present day ===
At the 2026 Met Gala, Rousteing designed a custom sheer gown for Beyoncé, featuring a crystal skeleton motif, a feathered train and a crown. It was his first independent project after leaving Balmain.

In July 2026, Rousteing was appointed creative director of Rabanne, succeeding Julien Dossena, who had led the fashion house for 13 years.

== Other activities ==
Rousteing designed the costumes for the opera, Renaissance – a 27-minute ballet with 22 dancers, which was choreographed by Sébastien Bertaud and opened at Opéra de Paris on 13 June 2017.

== Personal life ==
Rousteing was adopted and is gay. Though he had previously believed he was mixed race because of his skin colour, in 2019, he discovered that he is fully black, with a Somali birth mother from Djibouti and an Ethiopian birth father. The 2019 documentary Wonder Boy, written and directed by Anissa Bonnefont, examines his professional career and his search for his biological mother, who was aged 13 when she had him.
