= HP Mini =

Former line of small computers

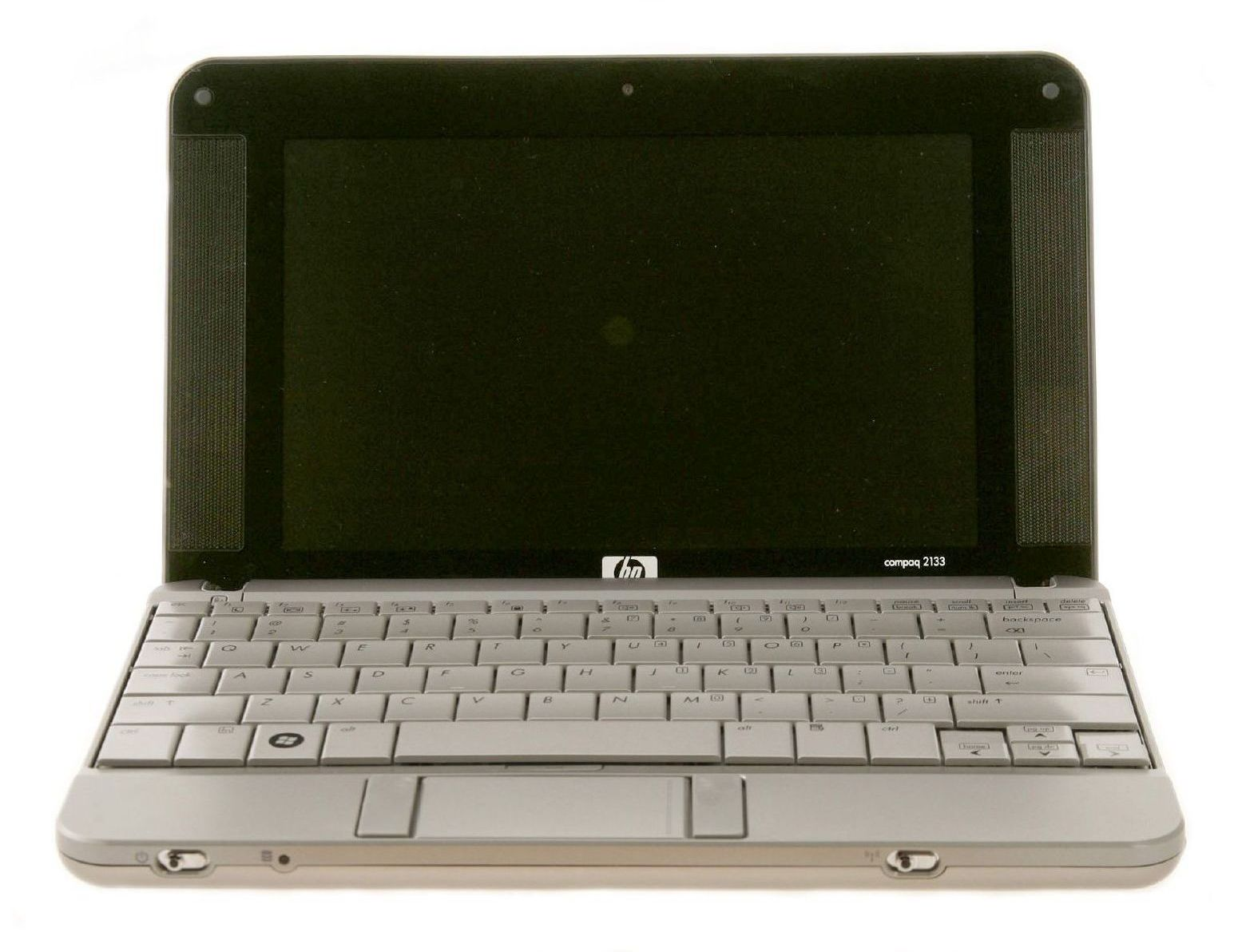
- HP 2133 Mini-Note PC (2008)
- Manufacturer: Hewlett-Packard (HP Inc.)
- Type: Subnotebook/Netbook
- Released: April 15, 2008
- Discontinued: 2012

HP Mini is a former line of small computers categorized as netbooks manufactured by Hewlett-Packard. They either contained a custom version of Ubuntu Linux, Windows XP Home Edition, or Windows 7 Starter operating system. Like most netbooks, they were not built with CD/DVD drives.

They were announced from mid-2007, and marketed from 2008 through 2012.

== Summary ==
HP Mini models
Model	Year	Type	Case	Screen
1000	2008	Palmtop	11 in (28 cm)	8.9 in (23 cm)
2133	2008	Palmtop	11 in (28 cm)	8.9 in (23 cm)
110	2009	Consumer	11.5 in (29 cm)	10.1 in (26 cm)
110	2009	Palmtop	11 in (28 cm)	10.1 in (26 cm)
311	2009	NVIDIA Ion base	12.5 in (32 cm)	11.6 in (29 cm)
1151nr	2009	Affordable business	11.5 in (29 cm)	10.1 in (26 cm)
2140	2009	Palmtop	11 in (28 cm)	10.1 in (26 cm)
5101	2009	Affordable business	11.5 in (29 cm)	10.1 in (26 cm)
210	2010	Consumer	11.5 in (29 cm)	10.1 in (26 cm)
210 HD	2010	Consumer	11.5 in (29 cm)	10.1 in (26 cm)
2102	2010	Affordable business	11.5 in (29 cm)	10.1 in (26 cm)
5102	2010	Affordable business	11.5 in (29 cm)	10.1 in (26 cm)
1103	2011	Affordable business	11.5 in (29 cm)	10.1 in (26 cm)
5103	2011	Affordable business	11.5 in (29 cm)	10.1 in (26 cm)

== 2133 ==
The first model.

== 1000 and 700 ==
HP Mini 1000
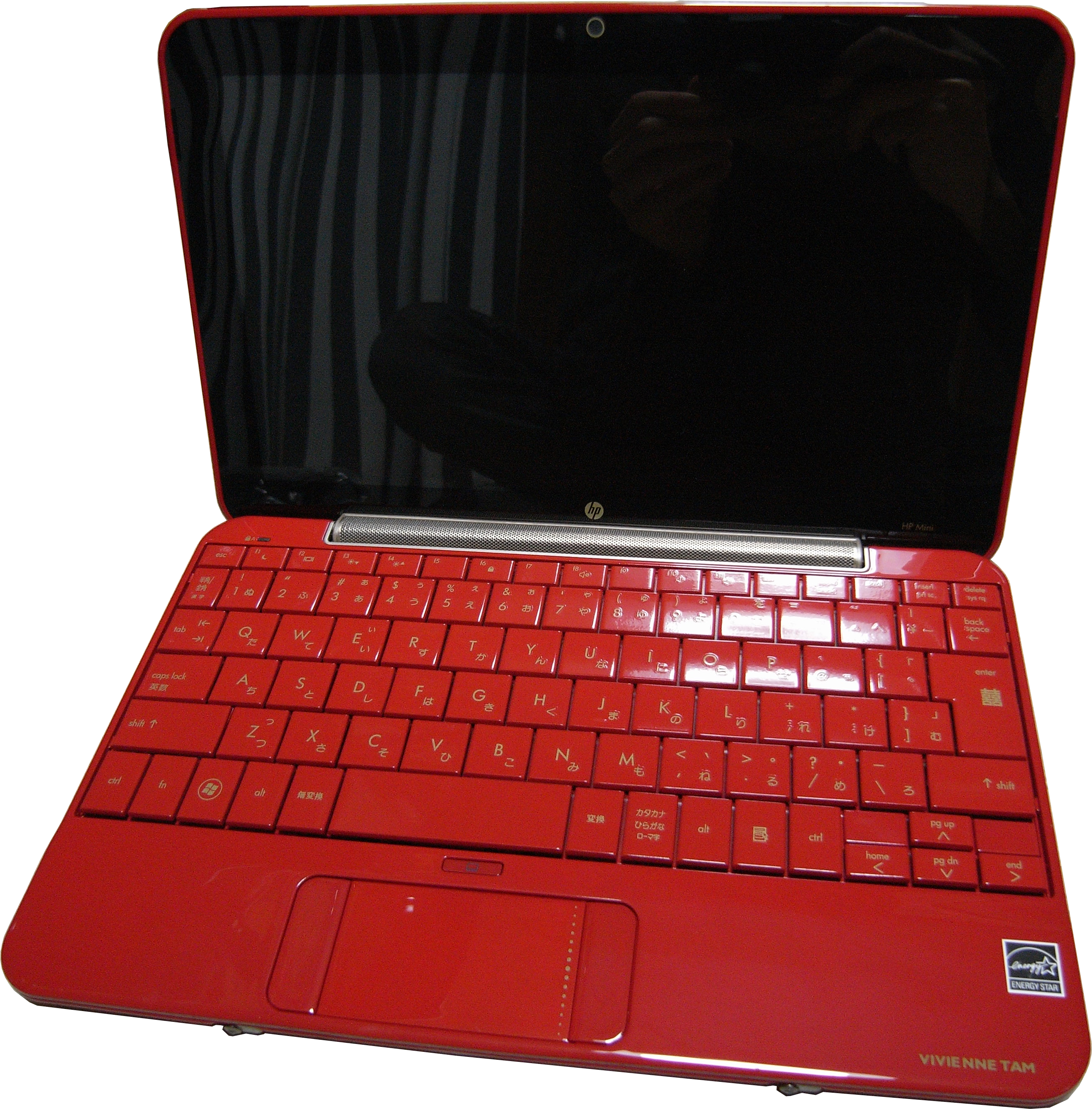
- Type: palmtop, netbook
- Operating system: Ubuntu, Windows (XP or 7)
- CPU: Intel Atom N270 (1.6 GHz)
- Memory: 1 GB / 2 GB max
- Storage: 8/16 GB SSD or 60/80/120/160GB 1.8" PATA HDD
- Display: LED-backlit LCD: 8.9" (22.6 cm) 1024x600 / 10.1" (25.7 cm) 1024x576
- Graphics: Intel GMA 950
- Input: microphone, touchpad, keyboard (92% full size)
- Camera: built-in webcam
- Connectivity: 10/100 Mbit Ethernet, 802.11b/g Wi-Fi, Bluetooth 2.0+EDR (option), 2 USB 2.0 ports, 3-in-1 memory card reader (SD, SDHC, MMC), dock connector
- Power: 3 hours of battery life (standard 3-cell battery)
- Dimensions: mm: 261 × 167 × 30
- Weight: 1.13 kg (2.5 lb) (with battery)

The HP Mini 1000 is a netbook by HP, adapting that company's HP 2133 Mini-Note PC education/business netbook for the consumer market. A similar but cheaper model named the HP Compaq Mini 700 will also be available in some regions with different cosmetics. A special edition machine, the HP Mini 1000 Vivienne Tam Edition, designed in collaboration with Vivienne Tam is also available. The three computers have similar specifications.

=== Specifications ===
Processor and memory — The HP Mini 1000 uses a 1.60 GHz Intel Atom N270 Processor and includes 1 GB of DDR2]-533 memory with support for up to 2 GB. The Mini has only one slot for RAM. Due to Microsoft's restrictions, the XP versions were only sold with 1 GB of RAM, but a user can easily upgrade to 2 GB by accessing the slot on the bottom of the computer and replacing the module.

Storage — The HP Mini 1000 shipped with either a 16/32 GB SSD or a 60/80 GB 1.8" hard disk drive. The HP Mini 1000 Mi Edition was also available with an 8 GB SSD. A ZIF SATA connector is used as opposed to standard PATA/SATA connector cables.

Motherboard — The motherboard uses the Intel 945GSE northbridge chipset and Intel ICH7M southbridge. The motherboard model is HP361A. The northbridge component provides the integrated Intel GMA950 graphics core.

Display — The Mini features either an 8.9- or 10.1-inch LED-backlit display. The 8.9" display has a resolution of 1024x600 pixels, the 10.1" is 1024x576 (10.2" @ 1024x600 is no longer sold). Both models feature stereo speakers, a webcam, and a single audio jack for both mic and headphones. Both the unit and the dock connector can carry a VGA connection. A first-party adaptor is available from the HP online store.

Power — A 3-cell battery is included as standard. A 6-cell battery can be ordered as an accessory, or (with the Mini 1000 and Digital Clutch only) chosen in place of the 3-cell battery during configuration. The 3-cell and 6-cell batteries provide up to 3 hours and 6 hours of run-time, respectively.

Connectivity — In addition to the aforementioned card reader, the system has two standard USB ports, a 10/100 Mbit Ethernet port, a single 3.5mm audio in/out mini-jack, and a power connector. The Mini 1000 also has a proprietary dock connector which can carry VGA, USB, RJ-45 (over USB), analogue audio in/out, and power. An 802.11b/g wireless NIC (Broadcom BCM4312) is included for Wi-Fi, while Bluetooth 2.0+EDR and a built-in HSDPA modem are options. It can be connected to Verizon for a one- or two-year contract.

=== Software ===
The Mini has Windows XP & Windows 7 Starter installed at launch and can be upgraded to Windows 10, while Mi (a special HP operating system based on Ubuntu, named for "mobile Internet" containing "HP MediaStyle" based on Elisa) was released in early January 2009 on the HP Mini 1000 "Mi Edition."

=== Reception ===
Initial reviews have been positive, complimenting the computer's keyboard and aesthetics as particular selling points in comparison to its market rivals, and the improved battery life and performance, and reduced price, as particularly important improvements over its antecedent, the HP 2133. However, reviewers noted that the diminutive 1.8-inch hard drive, usually used in digital audio players, performed slower than the 2.5-inch drives in competitors and criticized the decision to charge separately for a VGA adaptor. Although the battery life has been improved, it still does not stand out from the competition.

== 110 ==
HP Mini 110
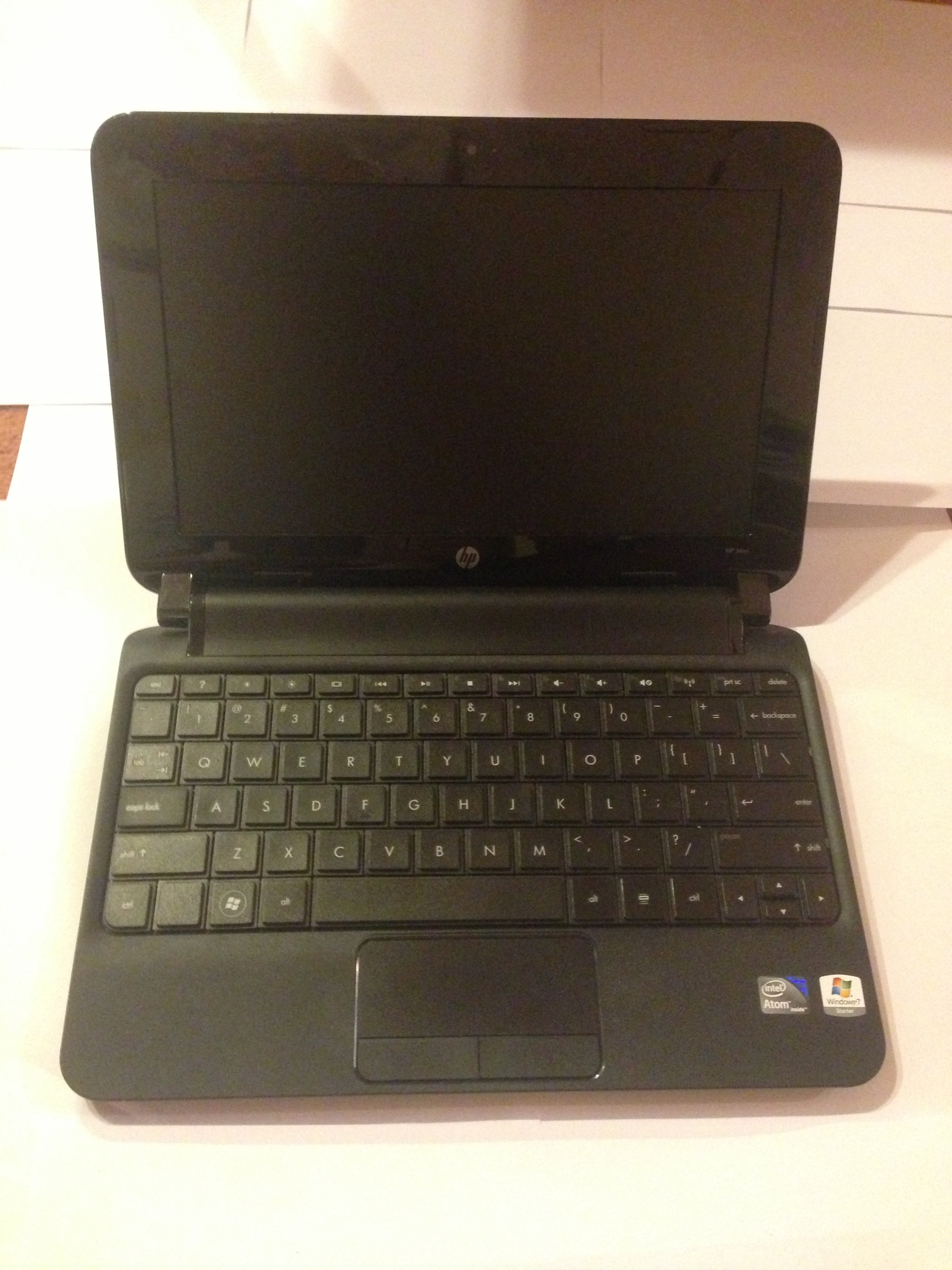
- Type: netbook (palmtop (early), Subnotebook (later))
- Operating system: Windows XP, Windows 7 Starter Edition
- CPU: Intel Atom from N270 (One core 1.6 GHz) up to N455
- Display: 10.1"
- Input: microphone, touchpad, keyboard
- Camera: webcam
- Dimensions: 10.3" x 6.6" x 1.2" or 11.4" x 8" x 1.2"
- Weight: 2.6 lb (1.2 kg) up to 3.1 lb (1.4 kg)

The HP Mini 110 is a line of low-end netbooks computers manufactured and sold by HP. The Mini 110 laptops have a different case, similar to compact palmtops models (in early versions) or a regular affordable netbooks (last releases). The HP Mini 110 series was released in October 2009.

== 210 ==
- The HP Mini 210, successor to the HP Mini 110, not only features improved CPU options but also offers better memory support, a sleeker design, and enhanced display choices. This series also feature Dolby Advanced Audio.
- Some models of HP Mini 210 cannot run latest version of Windows 10 due to display driver problems.
  HP Mini 210
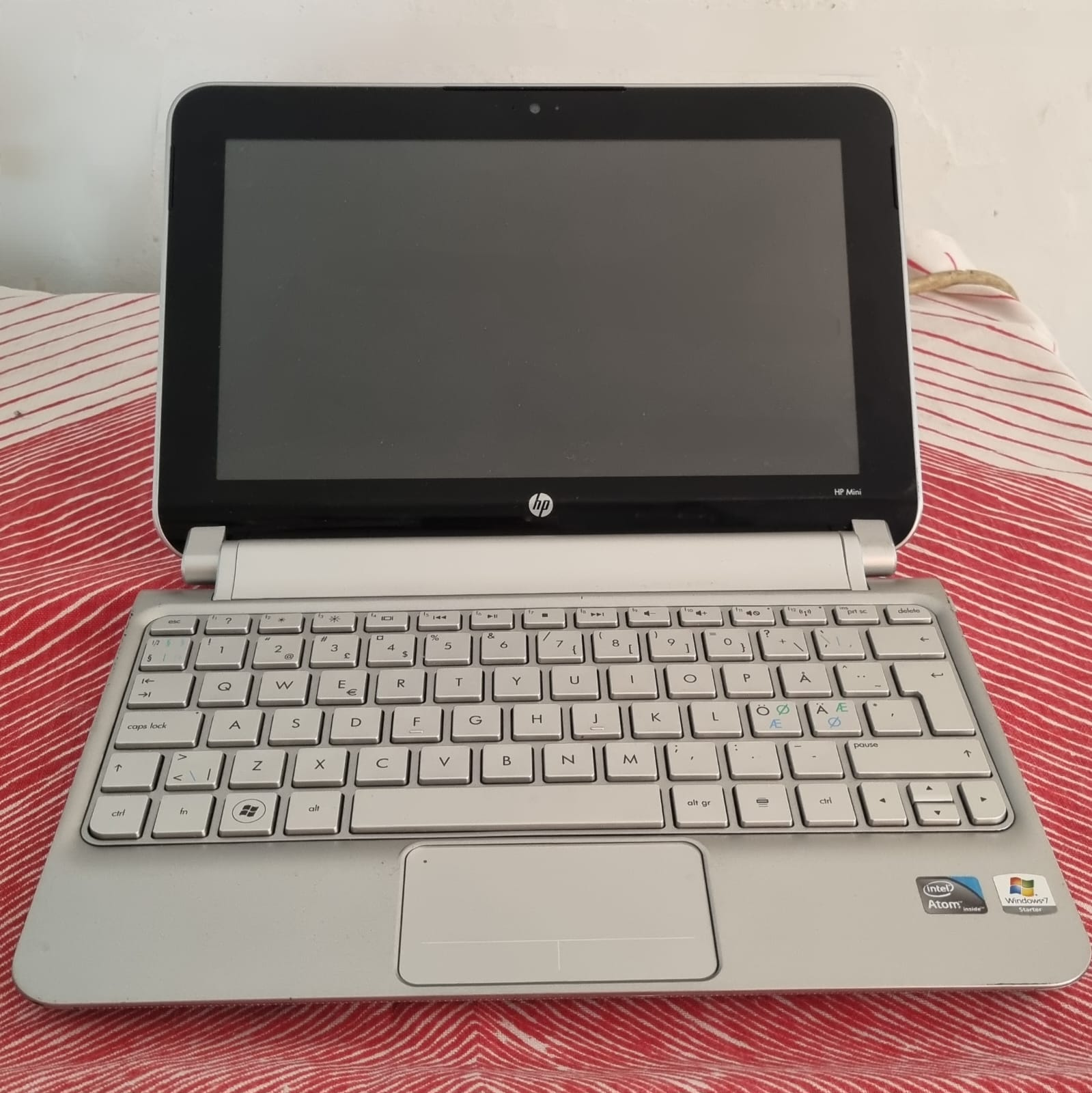
  - Picture of a HP Mini 210-2010so
  - Manufacturer: HP (Hewlett-Packard)
  - Type: netbook
  - Released: January 2010
  - Introductory price: €299, €300, €350, €400, €500, €600
  - Operating system: Windows 7 Starter
  - CPU: Intel Atom N450, Intel Attom N455, Intel Atom N470, Intel Atom N475, Intel Atom N550, Intel Atom N570, Intel Atom N2800.
  - Memory: 1GB or 2GB (DDR2 OR DDR3)
  - Storage: 160GB, 250GB or 320GB HDD's
  - Removable storage: 5-in-1 media card reader that supports SD (Secure Digital), MMC (MultiMedia Card), Memory Stick, Memory Stick Pro, and xD-Picture card formats
  - Display: 10.1" 1024x600 LCD or 10.1" 1366x768 LCD
  - Graphics: Intel Graphics Media Accelerator (GMA) 3150, Intel Graphics Media Accelerator (GMA) 3650, Intel Graphics Media Accelerator (GMA) HD Graphics
  - Sound: 3 Watt RMS Speakers ( 1.5W+1.5W ), Dolby Advanced Audio for enhanced sound quality
  - Camera: 0.3 MP VGA or 1.3 MP
  - Connectivity: Wi-Fi (802.11b/g/n), 10/100 Mbps Ethernet, Bluetooth (Optional, Version: 2.0+EDR), SIM (Optional, 3G that came with GPS)
  - Weight: Around 1.2-1.4 kg (2.7 to 3 pounds)
  - Model Number: HP Mini 210-1032NR, HP Mini 210-1030NR, HP Mini 210-1085, HP Mini 210-1018eg, HP Mini 210-1021EG, HP Mini 210-1020eg, HP Mini 210-1080ef, HP Mini 210-1002SA, HP Mini 210-1020sl, HP Mini 210-1050el, and many more

== 311 ==
HP Mini 311
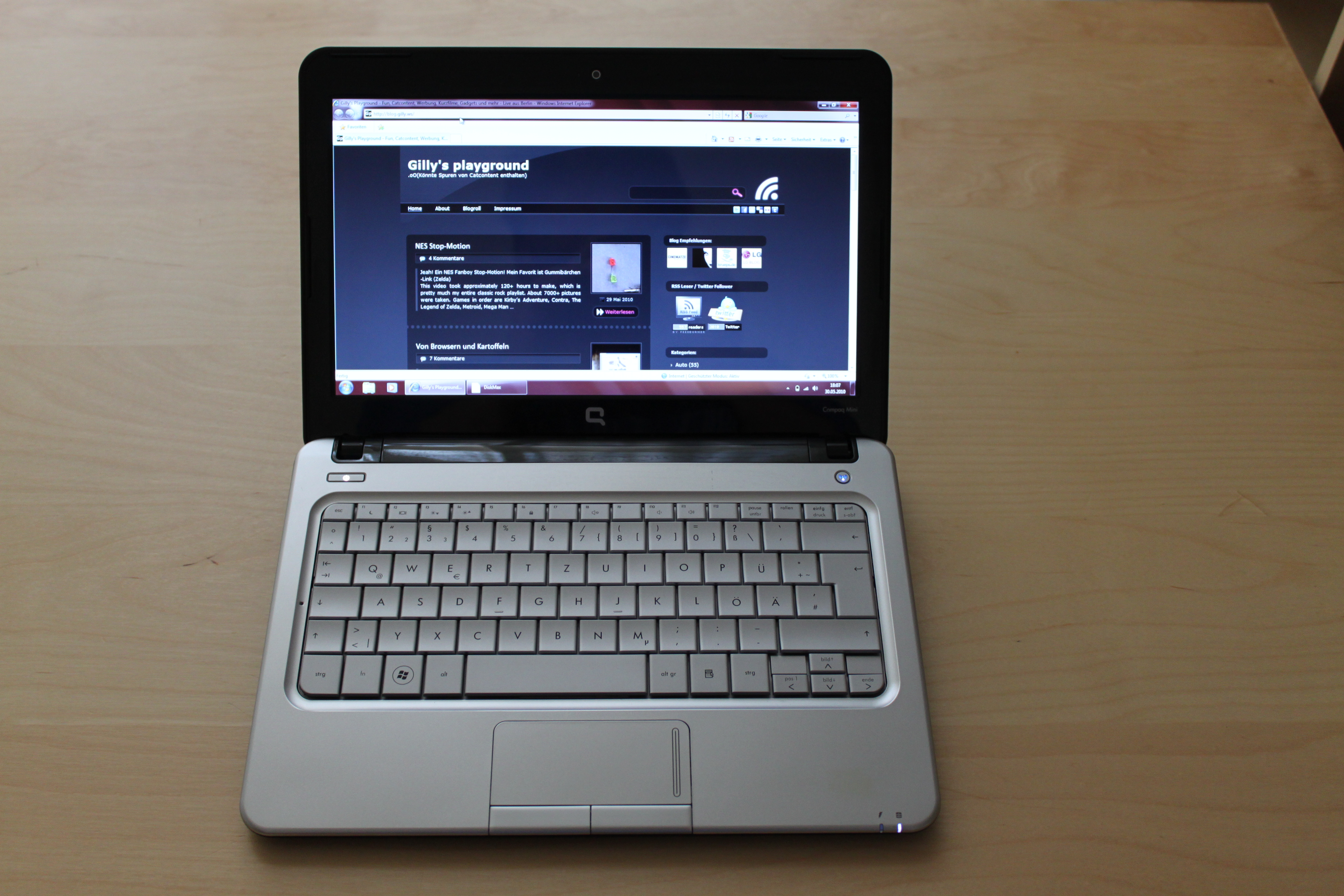
- Type: Subnotebook, netbook
- Released: September 24, 2009
- Introductory price: $399.99 US, £335 UK
- Operating system: Windows (XP or 7)
- CPU: Intel Atom N270 (One core 1.6 GHz), or N280 (1.66 GHz)
- Memory: 1, 2 or 3GB DDR3
- Storage: 160, 250 or 320 GB 2.5" HDD or 80 GB SSD
- Display: 11.6" 1366 × 768 LED-backlit LCD
- Input: microphone, touchpad, Keyboard
- Camera: 1.3 megapixel webcam
- Connectivity: 10/100 Mbit Ethernet, 802.11b/g Wi-Fi, 3 USB 2.0 ports, 5-in-1 memory card reader, bluetooth (option), VGA, HDMI
- Power: 6-cell Li-Ion battery (6.25 hours)
- Dimensions: mm: 290 x 204 x 20-30 in: 11.4 x 8.03 x 0.78-1.2
- Weight: 1.5 kg

This netbook was the first to use the Nvidia Ion platform, which allows hardware acceleration of high-definition video and increased gaming performance. It went on sale on HP's online store on September 24, 2009, for $399.99.

The laptop can be customized with either the Intel Atom N270 or N280 and uses the nVidia GeForce 9400M G graphics used in the ION platform. The unit is equipped with 1 GB of 1066 MHz DDR3 SDRAM soldered to the motherboard and a SO-DIMM slot which allows an upgrade to 2 GB or 3 GB. The netbook has a 160 GB, 250 GB, or 320 GB SATA hard drive @ 5,400 RPM. There are options for an external DVD burner or DVD burner/Blu-ray reader combo drive, as netbooks do not have integrated optical drives due to their small size. The Mini 311 has an 11.6" LED-backlit BrightView widescreen with a 1366 x 768 resolution and has an integrated webcam standard. Wi-Fi card options include Wireless G or Wireless N cards with optional Bluetooth and as well as optional Mobile Broadband from Verizon Wireless, AT&T or Sprint. I/O connectors include a 5-in-1 removable card reader, 3 USB 2.0 ports, a Fast Ethernet port, a VGA output, an HDMI output. The netbook uses Altec Lansing stereo speakers. There are 2 models in some areas. One has 1 GB RAM and Windows XP with ION LE and the other has 2 GB RAM and Windows 7 with ION.

In some regions, including Europe, the device is sold under the Compaq brand.

== 2140 ==
HP Mini 2140
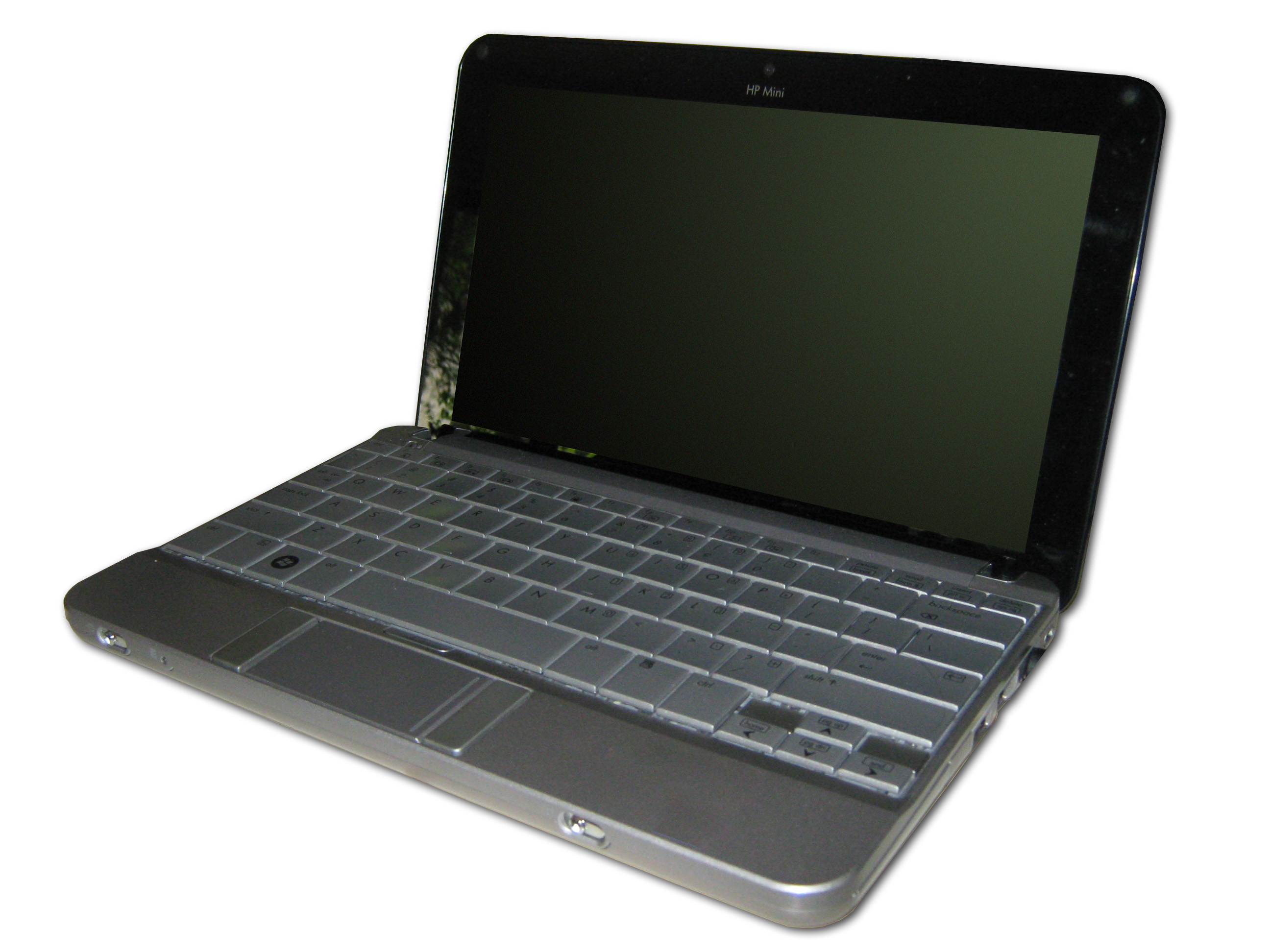
- Type: palmtop, netbook
- Operating system: SUSE Linux (SLED), FreeDOS, Windows (XP or Vista)
- CPU: Intel Atom N270 (1.6 GHz, 512 KB L2 cache, 533 MHz FSB)
- Memory: 1 or 2 GB 800 MHz DDR2 SDRAM (1 slot)
- Storage: On the customer's choice: 160 GB 5400 RPM SATA HDD; 160 GB 7200 RPM SATA HDD; 80 GB SSD
- Display: 10.1" LED-backlit scratch-resistant (1024×576 or 1366×768)
- Graphics: Intel GMA 950
- Sound: built-in stereo speakers, 2 W, 4 Ω
- Input: Keyboard, touchpad and stereo microphone
- Camera: built-in webcam (640×480) in screen bezel
- Touchpad: Touchpad with scroll zone, two soft-touch buttons and a toggle button
- Connectivity: Ethernet: Marvell 10/100/1000 Mbit/s; Wi-Fi: Broadcom 4322AGN 802.11a/b/g/n; Bluetooth 2.0: HP Integrated module; USB 2.0: 2x ports (1x powered); Expresscard 54 slot; Audio: 2x 3.5mm TRS jacks (microphone and headphone); Video: 1x VGA connector; Card reader: SD, SDHC and MMC
- Power: 3-cell (28 WHr) or 6-cell (55 WHr) Li-Ion battery
- Dimensions: mm: 261.4 × 166.2 × 26.7 in: 10.30 × 6.54 × 1.05
- Weight: 1.19 kg (2.6 lb)
- Predecessor: HP 2133 Mini-Note PC

The HP Mini 2140 is an update to the HP 2133 Mini-Note PC which was announced in early January 2009.

=== Details ===
The new components are a 1.6 GHz single-core Intel Atom processor, a 10.2-inch "standard definition" or "high definition" (1024×576 or 1366×768 pixel) LED-backlit LCD (with a glass cover and acrylic coating), an Intel GMA 950 graphics adapter, and a 160 GB HDD (5400 or 7200rpm) or 80 GB eMMC-based solid-state drive. Operating systems available are similar to those for the Mini-Note 2133: SUSE Linux Enterprise Desktop, FreeDOS, Windows Vista (Home Basic or Business), Windows XP Home (only on 1 GB RAM models) or Professional (through downgrade rights from Vista Business).

Its features, accessories and appearance are otherwise identical to the HP 2133, however HP predict that the new processor and screen will give it up to 8.5 hours of run time on the 6-cell battery. A docking station will be made available. The updated machine was initially available in various configurations with prices starting at $499USD for a system with the "standard definition" display, hard disk drive, 1 GB of RAM, and 3-cell battery, without Bluetooth or 802.11n support, running Windows XP Home.

The successor version, HP Mini 2150 was announced, but not presented.

=== Reception ===
A review by Laptop Magazine (of a system with a 1024×576 pixel display and 2 GB of RAM running Windows XP) has complimented HP for addressing common criticisms of the earlier model. The reviewer notes that the Mini 2140 produced much less heat, although the underside did become warm, and had much improved battery life compared to the Mini-Note 2133. Their system continuously loaded websites for 3 hours and 32 minutes on the small 3-cell battery, and 7 hours and 19 minutes on the larger 6-cell battery. However, the reviewer chided HP for the low resolution display which showed approximately "two lines" less than netbooks with 1024×600 pixel displays. Otherwise, praises and criticisms of the 2140 were similar to those for the 2133. The magazine gave the system their "Editor's Choice" award.

=== Similar products from HP ===
A new HP notebook similar in appearance to the Mini-Note, called the HP Mini 1000 Vivienne Tam Edition, was unveiled in October 2008, with a launch expected for December that year. The small pink computer is a collaboration with fashion designer Vivienne Tam, and has a 10-inch screen, a 1.6 GHz Intel Atom processor, 1 GB of RAM, and an 80 GB hard disk drive. A few days later, a black notebook of otherwise similar appearance called the "HP Mini 1000" was informally revealed by a banner on the company's store, and officially announced on the 29 October 2008. Unlike the 2133, this device is meant for the home market.

== 5101 ==
The HP Mini 5101 contains an Intel Atom N280 processor and usually 1 GB RAM.

== 5102 ==
The 5102 has an Intel Atom N450 processor. It was offered with an optional touch screen. It has a black keyboard.

== 5103 ==
The HP Mini 5103 was announced in 2010. Compared to the HP Mini 210, it had advanced features like touch screen, Intel Atom N550 Processor.

Comparison of HP mini 210 and HP Mini 5103
Specs	HP Mini 210	HP Mini 5103
CPU	Intel Atom N455/475	Intel Atom N550
CPU cores	1	2
Memory	DDR3	
HDD	5400 RPM	
Face recognition	Yes	
Touch Screen	No	Optional
Weight in pounds	Approx. 3 pounds (1.4 kg)	
Finishing	Metallic look with plastic	Metallic look
Battery Life (terms of processor	10 hours	8 to 10 hours
Battery Type	6 Cell	
Price	US$329.99	US$399.99
Form factor	Ultraportable	
Screen size	10 inches (25 cm)	
