= Antonin Tron =

French fashion designer (born 1984)

- Born: 1984 (age 41–42); Paris, France
- Occupations: Fashion designer, creative director
- Employer: Balmain (2025–present)

Antonin Tron (born 1984) is a French fashion designer. His brand is Atlein, and he is the creative director of Balmain since November 2025.

== Life and career ==
Antonin Tron was born in 1984 in Paris, France. He attended the Académie royale des beaux-arts d'Anvers, from 2004 until his graduation in 2008. During his studies, he interned at Vivienne Westwood in London.

He worked as an assistant for Olivier Rizzo until the end of 2008, and then started an internship with Raf Simons. In September 2009, he started working on menswear at Louis Vuitton along with Paul Helbers sur les collections hommes. In 2011, Tron joined Givenchy as a designer for the women collections, alongside Riccardo Tisci. In January 2012, he was hired by Nicolas Ghesquière to work for Balenciaga. Later, he worked freelance for Alexander Wang and Demna Gvasalia.

In 2016, Tron launched the brand Atlein. The brand name is a portmanteau of the word 'Atlantic' and the German word 'allein', meaning 'alone'. He was awarded the prix des Premières Collections by the Association nationale pour le développement des arts de la mode, and earned a 100,000 euros grant. During his very first fashion show, Anna Wintour tweeted about his collection, attracting attention on the brand. This allowed Tron to sell his clothes at department stores such as Neiman Marcus, Nordstrom or Galeries Lafayette. In 2017, his brand was a finalist for the LVMH Prize. In July 2018, he received the Grand Prix from the Association nationale pour le développement des arts de la mode, with a 250,000 euros grant. In 2024, he created a collection in collaboration with Kylie Jenner's brand Khy.

On November 12, 2025, Tron was announced to be the creative director of Balmain.

== Style ==
With his brand Atlein, Tron was known for his dresses made of draped jersey. In a portrait published in the September 2016 edition of Vogue, fashion journalist Hamish Bowles compared him to Alaïa. He is inspired by Jean Muir. British Vogue listed Atlein among fashion creators they deemed part of a "new wave of talent".
