= ESMOD =

French private fashion school

École supérieure des arts et techniques de la mode
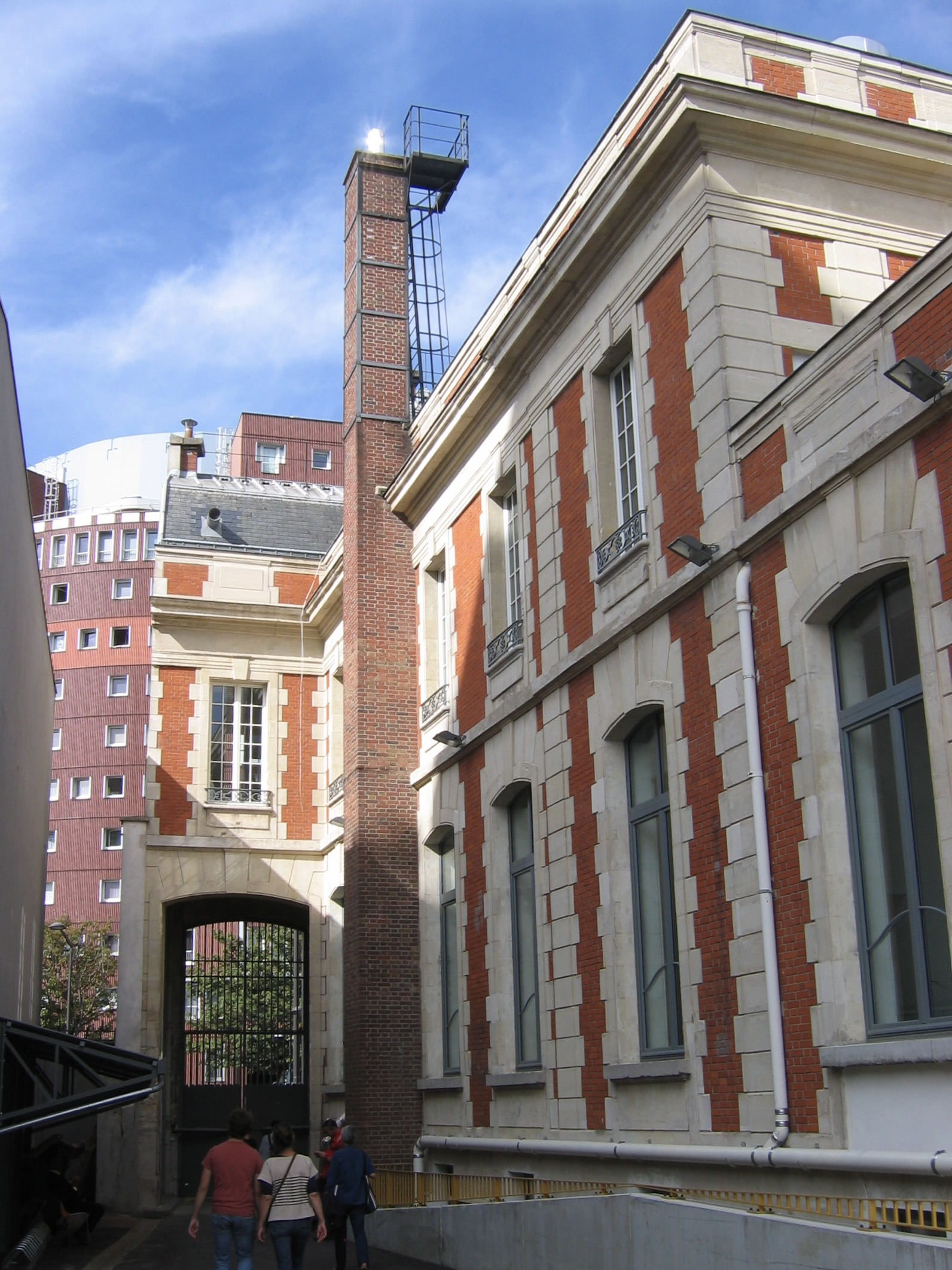
- Established: 1841; 185 years ago
- Affiliations: Union of Independent Grandes Écoles
- President: Christine Walter-Bonini
- Location: Paris, France; 48.8777°N 2.3345°E
- Campus: 12 rue de la Rochefoucauld 75009 Paris
- Website: esmod.com

The École supérieure des arts et techniques de la mode, or ESMOD, is a French private school of fashion. It was founded in Paris in 1841 by Alexis Lavigne. It has branches in Bordeaux, Lyon, Paris, Rennes and Roubaix in France, and in a number of cities in other countries.

== Accreditation ==
The École supérieure des arts et techniques de la mode is authorised by the Commission nationale de la certification professionnelle (France Compétences), the French national commission for vocational certification, to award a five-year professional certification as fashion stylist/designer at level 6 of the European Qualifications Framework.

It has been accredited by the French Ministry of Culture since 2014.

In 2022, its Master's-level diploma ‘Fashion and Creative Industries Creative Director’ (level 7) obtained academic accreditation from the French Ministry of Higher Education and Research by ministerial decision of 28 June 2021, published in the Bulletin Officiel of 22 July 2021.

== Branches ==
Africa and the Middle East
- Tunis (Tunisia, 1989–present)
- Damascus (Syria, 1995–present)
- Sousse (Tunisia, 1997–present)
- Beirut (Lebanon, 1999–present)
- Dubai (United Arab Emirates, 2006–present)
- Istanbul (Turkey, 2010–present)
Asia
- Tokyo (Japan, 1984–present)
- Seoul (South Korea, 1989–present)
- Jakarta (Indonesia, 1996–present)
- Kuala Lumpur (Malaysia, 2011–present)
- Guangzhou (China, 2014–present)
- Beijing (China, 2017–closed)
Europe
- Paris (France, 1841–present)
- Rennes (France, 1989–present)
- Munich (Germany, 1989–closed)
- Oslo (Norway, 1990–present)
- Bordeaux (France, 1991–present)
- Lyon (France, 1991–present)
- Roubaix (France, 1994–present)
- Berlin (Germany, 1994–closed)
- Moscow (Russia, 2006–closed)
- Tbilisi (Georgia, opening soon)

A branch once operated in São Paulo.

== Alumni ==
Alumni of the school include Reem Acra, Franck Sorbier, Lara Cosima Henckel von Donnersmarck, Olivier Rousteing, Rachel Harvey, and Seo Eunkyo. Simon Porte Jacquemus of Jacquemus also attended for a short time.

Akira Takeuchi and Tayuka Nakanishi were alumni and graduated from ESMOD Tokyo.
