= Reem Acra =

Lebanese fashion designer

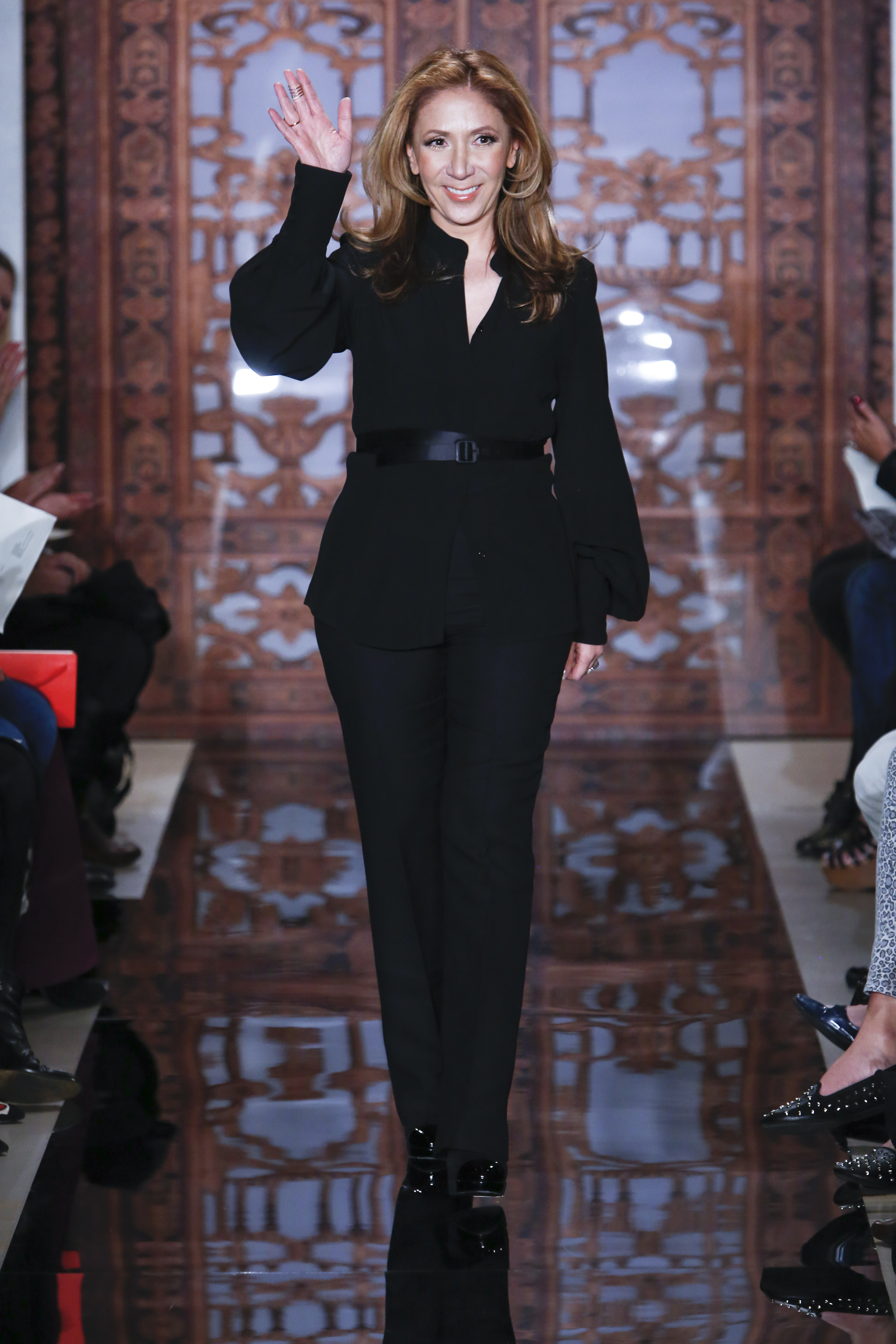
- Born: ريم عكرا; Beirut, Lebanon
- Education: American University of Beirut, ESMOD, Fashion Institute of Technology
- Occupation: Fashion Designer
- Known for: Eponymous bridal gown line & ready-to-wear collection
- Awards: Fashion Design Department’s award, Ellis Island award

Reem Acra (Arabic: ريم عكرا) is a fashion designer born in Beirut, Lebanon, known for her eponymous bridal gown line and her ready-to-wear collection.

== Biography ==
=== Early life and education ===
Reem Acra studied at the American University of Beirut, where her parents both worked. Her mother, Nadia, worked in the family medicine department, and her father, Aftim, was a prominent and distinguished academic, professor, public health expert, and an amber collector. She grew up with three brothers, Michael, Fadi, and Sari, in Beirut.

While a teenager, she joined the fashion club at the American University in Beirut where she graduated in 1982 with a business degree. She held a fashion show in June 1982 that attracted 2,000 people. In 1986, she graduated magna cum laude from the Fashion Institute of Technology in New York and won the Fashion Design Department’s award for her year. After graduating from FIT, Acra studied at the École Supérieure des Arts et Techniques de la Mode design school in Paris.

Acra left Beirut in 1983, relocating to New York City, during the peak of the Lebanese Civil War.

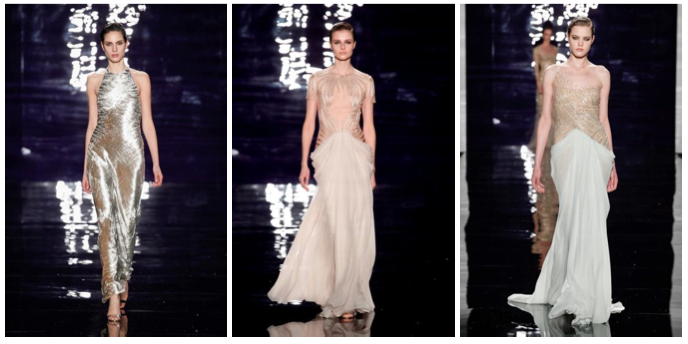
Reem Acra's designs on the runway.

After her studies at ESMOD in Paris, Acra took mainstream fashion design positions in Hong Kong and Taiwan. At the age of 25 she was overseeing a $30 million project, but left after seven years to start her own line in New York.

Acra worked as a luxury interior designer for three years before starting her own line.

=== Fashion design ===
Acra started her company in 1997 as a bridal line, after designing a dress for a friend's wedding in three weeks, on a bet that if she could meet the deadline, her friend, would go through with the wedding, set in Paris at the Hôtel de Crillon. Acra took a photograph of the dress and distributed it to the media, including The New York Times, which published the photograph. She held her first fashion show in 1999.

Soon after, she bought $20,000 in fabric with her American Express card, pitched designs to Saks Fifth Avenue and Kleinfeld, and received an order for thirty dresses. She then worked with 89-year-old Max Kane, who owned a factory on 39th Street in Manhattan's Hell's Kitchen. Acra credits her early success with Kane's mentoring and support. After working with Kane, Acra expanded her business to additional factories and opened her own production centers. Her brand expanded to include evening-gowns in 2003 and a ready-to-wear collection in 2008. Her designs are carried in more than 150 retailers around the world.

Her atelier is located on West 35th Street in Manhattan.

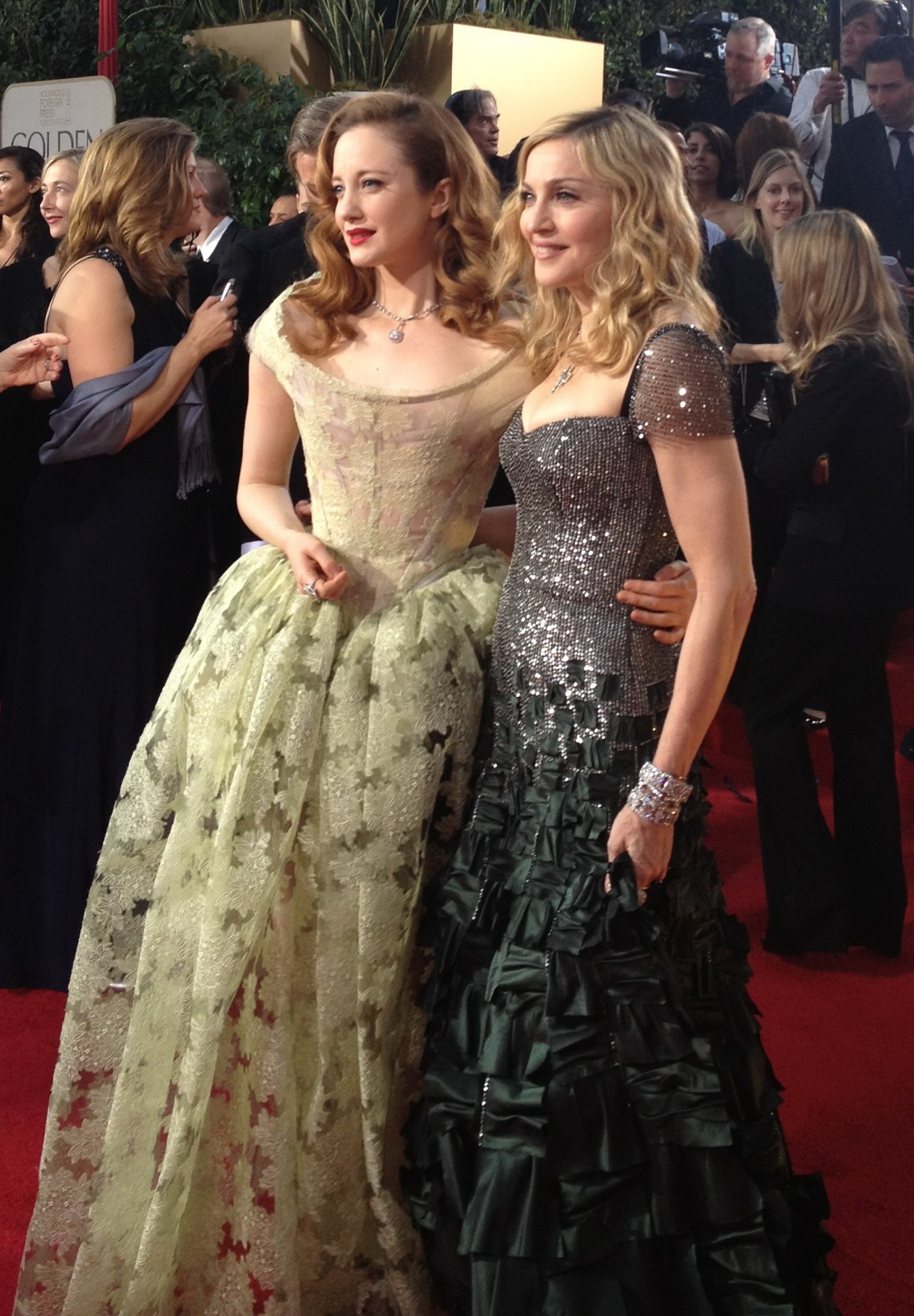
Madonna (right) wearing Reem Acra at the 69th Golden Globe Awards in 2012.

The following celebrities have worn Acra's gowns: Christina Applegate, Halle Berry, Beyoncé, Jill Biden, Julie Bowen, Jane Fonda, Selena Gomez, Anna Gunn, Katherine Heigl, Angelina Jolie, Eva Longoria, Jennifer Lopez, Madonna, Olivia Munn, Nicole Richie, Kristen Stewart, Tika Sumpter, Taylor Swift, Olivia Wilde, Reese Witherspoon, Robin Wright, Catherine Zeta-Jones, Melania Trump, Usha Vance, and Allison Janney.

The following celebrities have worn Acra's bridal gowns during their weddings; LeAnn Rimes, Jenna Dewan, and Marcia Cross.

In August 2007, a limited edition Reem Acra Bride Barbie doll was released, intended for adult collectors.

In 2021, Reem Acra dressed Jill Biden for the inauguration of President Biden.

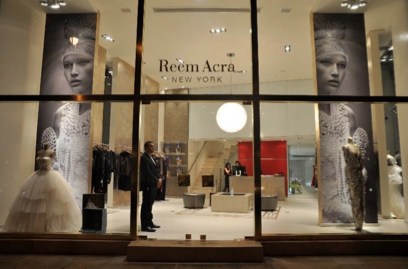
A photograph through the front window of Reem Acra's Beirut boutique.

In November 2010, she opened a store in Beirut, which sells Acra's evening wear and ready-to-wear collections, in addition to accessories and a bridal salon. The store is located at 94 Avenue Foch. Acra's retail reach is spread throughout all major fancy international destinations. Acra also launched a line on the Home Shopping Network in September 2010.

In 2014, Acra designed and produced the uniforms for the American University of Beirut Medical Center, where her parents both had worked.

Actress Allison Janney wore a bright red Acra gown with floor length sleeves while accepting the 2018 Oscar for Best Supporting Actress.

== Awards and honors ==
- Building Bridges award (October 2014) from Bridges of Understanding
- Member of the Council of Fashion Designers of America
- Member of the Dubai Design and Fashion Council since its creation
- Ellis Island award

== Personal life ==
=== Homes ===
Acra's home in New York City is a 3,200-square-foot loft in the Garment District, Manhattan. A New York magazine profile of Acra's apartment describes it as featuring: "...[a] striking photograph by Ruvén Afanador ... part of an ad campaign for Acra's bridal business; she enlarged it and let it take over a wall, transforming the image into a piece of art. A table was fashioned from blocks of resin that contain delicate pieces of sequin-embroidered lace that Acra used in her first bridal designs, an idea inspired by her father's collection of amber.

In addition to her New York City loft, Acra bought and renovated a 2,400-square-foot apartment in the husk of a bombed-out, 19th-century building in Saifi Village near downtown Beirut. A Wall Street Journal story on the apartment characterizes it as having minimal furnishings and bold colors. "I didn't want to overwhelm the place with things," Acra told a reporter for the story. She owns four homes altogether, two in Beirut, one in New York and one in Nashville.

=== World Equestrian Games ===
Acra's label has sponsored the Fédération Équestre Internationale World Cup Dressage series since 2010. Acra also has sponsored FEI's annual Best Athlete award.

Acra has designed gowns for the winners of her namesake Reem Acra Athlete of the Year award winners Adelinde Cornelissen and Charlotte Dujardin.
