= Christophe Decarnin =

French fashion designer (born 1964)

Christophe Decarnin (pronounced [kʁis.tɔf də.kaʁ.nɛ̃] born 1964 in Le Touquet), is a French fashion designer. Decarnin studied fashion design at ESMOD in Paris before being recruited by Paco Rabanne, where he remained seven years as Artistic Director.

From 2006, Decarnin was creative director at Balmain. In April 2011, following Decarnin's absence at the house's Autumn/Winter 2011 show, it was announced that the designer had relinquished his position with Balmain.

In 2014 Christophe Decarnin became the creative director of French clothing brand Faith Connexion. In March 2017 the brand had its first runway show.
