= Ginette Spanier =

French grand couturier (1904 -1988)

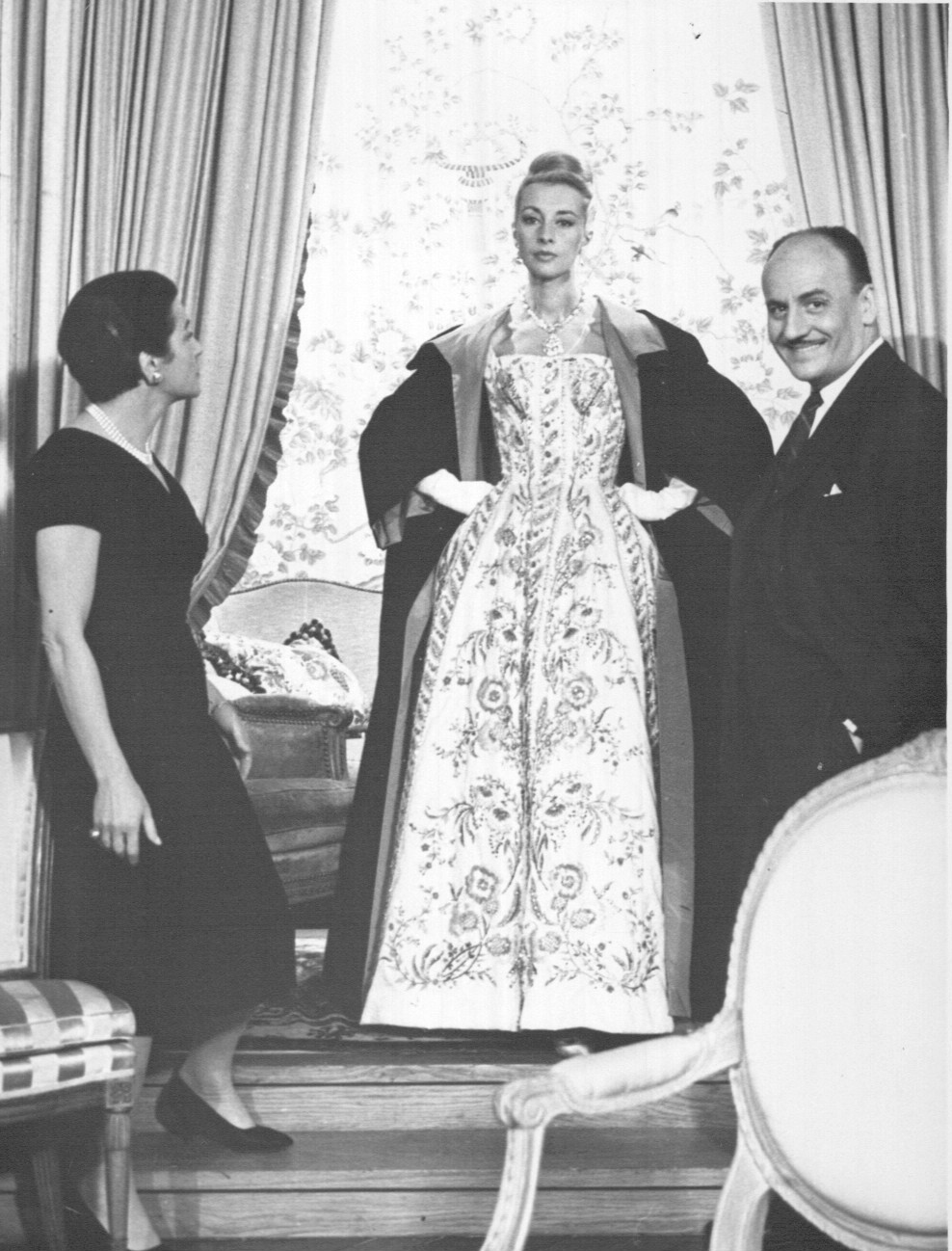
- Ginette Spanier, Marie Teresa and Pierre Balmain, 1960
- Born: Jenny Yvonne Spanier; 7 March 1904; Paris, France
- Died: April 1, 1988 (aged 84); London, England
- Occupation: Director of a fashion-house
- Years active: 1947–1976
- Employer: House of Balmain
- Spouse: Paul-Emile Seidmann

Jenny Yvonne "Ginette" Spanier (7 March 1904 – 1 April 1988) was a French director of the House of Balmain, a Paris fashion-house, and was decorated for her wartime work.

== Early life ==
Spanier, who was Jewish, was born in Paris on 7 March 1904 and raised in Hampstead, London, England and attended Frognal School there.

== War years ==
While in Paris as a buyer for Fortnum & Mason, she met Paul-Emile Seidmann, a doctor. In 1939, they married. Shortly afterwards, during World War II, they fled Nazi-occupied Paris by bicycle. She was subsequently awarded the Medal of Freedom for assisting the American Army of Liberation. Seidmann was made a Chevalier de la Légion d'honneur for his work with concentration camp survivors.

== Balmain ==
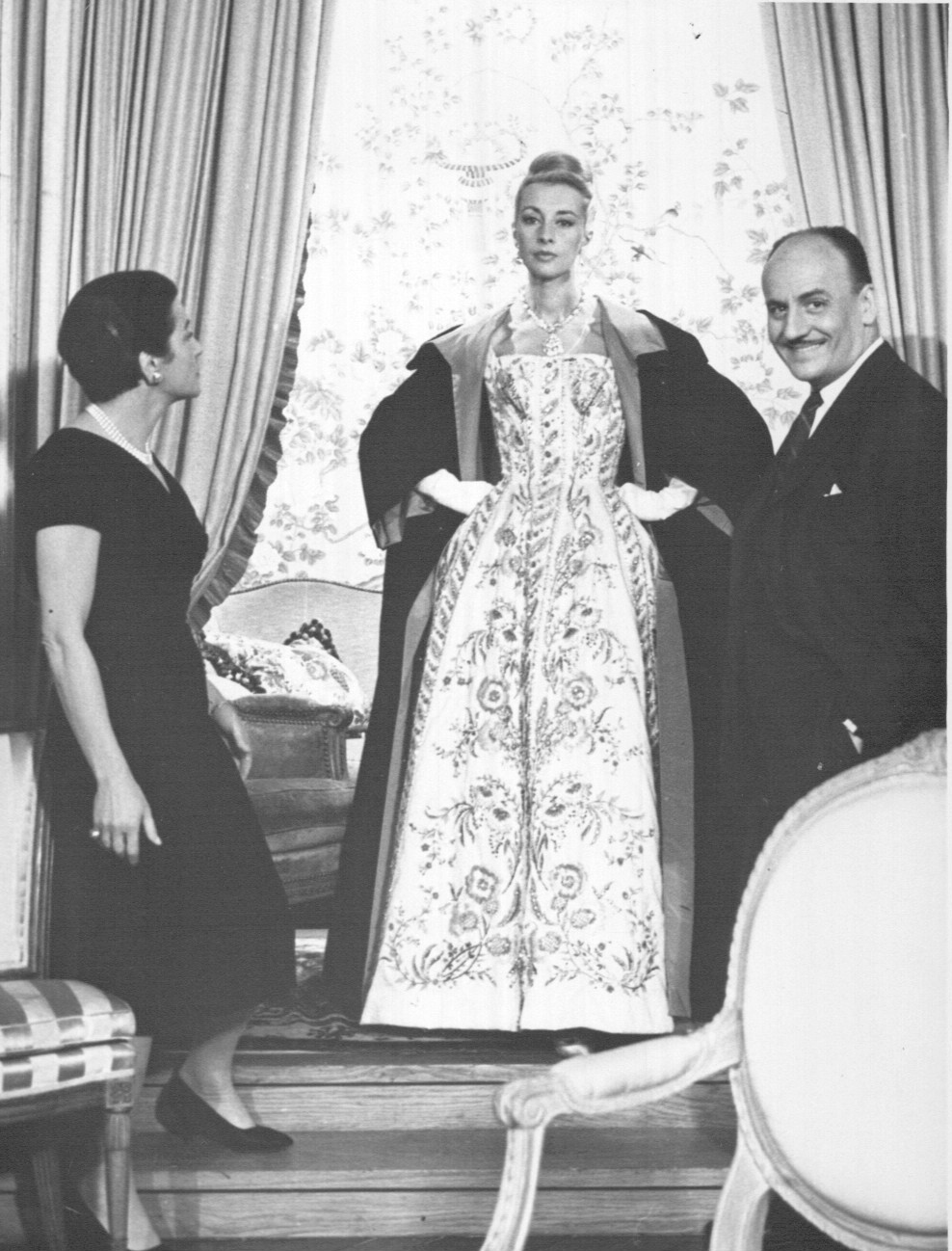
Spanier (left) with model Marie Teresa and Pierre Balmain at Balmain's Croissy home

After the war, the couple lived for many years on Paris' Avenue Maurice, and she became directrice (director) at Balmain from 1947 to 1976. The first of her two volumes of autobiography, It isn't All Mink (1959), had a foreword by Noël Coward, the second volume, And Now It's Sables (1970), had one by Maurice Chevalier.

Spanier appeared as a castaway on the BBC Radio programme Desert Island Discs on 21 June 1965. The programme was not archived by the BBC, but an unofficial tape copy was among a collection of over 90 episodes discovered by an amateur researcher and placed online in 2022. She was also the guest on This Is Your Life on 9 February 1972.

== Death ==
She retired, a widow, to London, and died there in April 1988.

== Bibliography ==
- It isn't All Mink. 1959.
- And Now it's Sables. Robert Hale. 1970. ISBN 978-0709135067.
- Road to Freedom The story of her life under the German Occupation. Robert Hale. 1976. ISBN 978-0709155928.
