= Theatre Products =

Japanese fashion brand

Theatre Products (Japanese: シアタープロダクツ) is a Japanese fashion brand founded in 2001, and is based in Roppongi, Tokyo. The brand was founded by Kao Kanamori (born 1974), Akira Takeuchi, and Tayuka Nakanishi. Since 2008, its main designers are Akira Takeuchi and Tayuka Nakanishi. The brand has retail outlets in the Harajuku and Shibuya areas of Tokyo, known as centers of youth fashion.
