= Tayuka Nakanishi =

Japanese fashion designer (born 1976)

- 中西 妙佳
- Born: 1976 (age 49–50); Kanagawa Prefecture, Japan
- Education: ESMOD Tokyo
- Occupation: Fashion designer

Tayuka Nakanishi (Japanese: 中西 妙佳; born 1976, Kanagawa Prefecture) is a Japanese fashion designer. Along with Akira Takeuchi, she a main designer of the Theatre Products fashion brand.

She graduated from ESMOD Tokyo. Nakanishi worked as a pattern-maker for the Japanese fashion brand Comme des Garçons until 1999.
