= Alexis Lavigne =

French fashion designer and tailor (1812–1886)

- Born: March 22, 1812; Paris, France
- Died: February 21, 1886 (aged 73); Neuilly-sur-Seine, France

Alexis Lavigne (March 26, 1812 – February 21, 1886) was a French tailor and inventor. He invented the couture mannequin and the supple measuring tape.

In 1841, he established the first fashion school in the world, Guerre-Lavigne, which became ESMOD in 1976.
