= Hervé Pierre (designer) =

French-American fashion and costume designer (born 1965)

Hervé Pierre Braillard
- Born: 1965 (age 60–61); France
- Citizenship: American
- Education: École de la chambre syndicale de la couture parisienne; Sorbonne
- Label: Hervé Pierre

Hervé Pierre Braillard, known as Hervé Pierre, (born 1965) is a French-American fashion and costume designer. In 1987, he received the first Christian Dior award from the Comité Colbert. Pierre has designed fashions for four United States first ladies since the 1990s: Hillary Clinton, Laura Bush, Michelle Obama, and Melania Trump.

== Early life and education ==
After graduating from the École de la chambre syndicale de la couture parisienne,, he studied at the art history department of the Sorbonne.

== Career ==
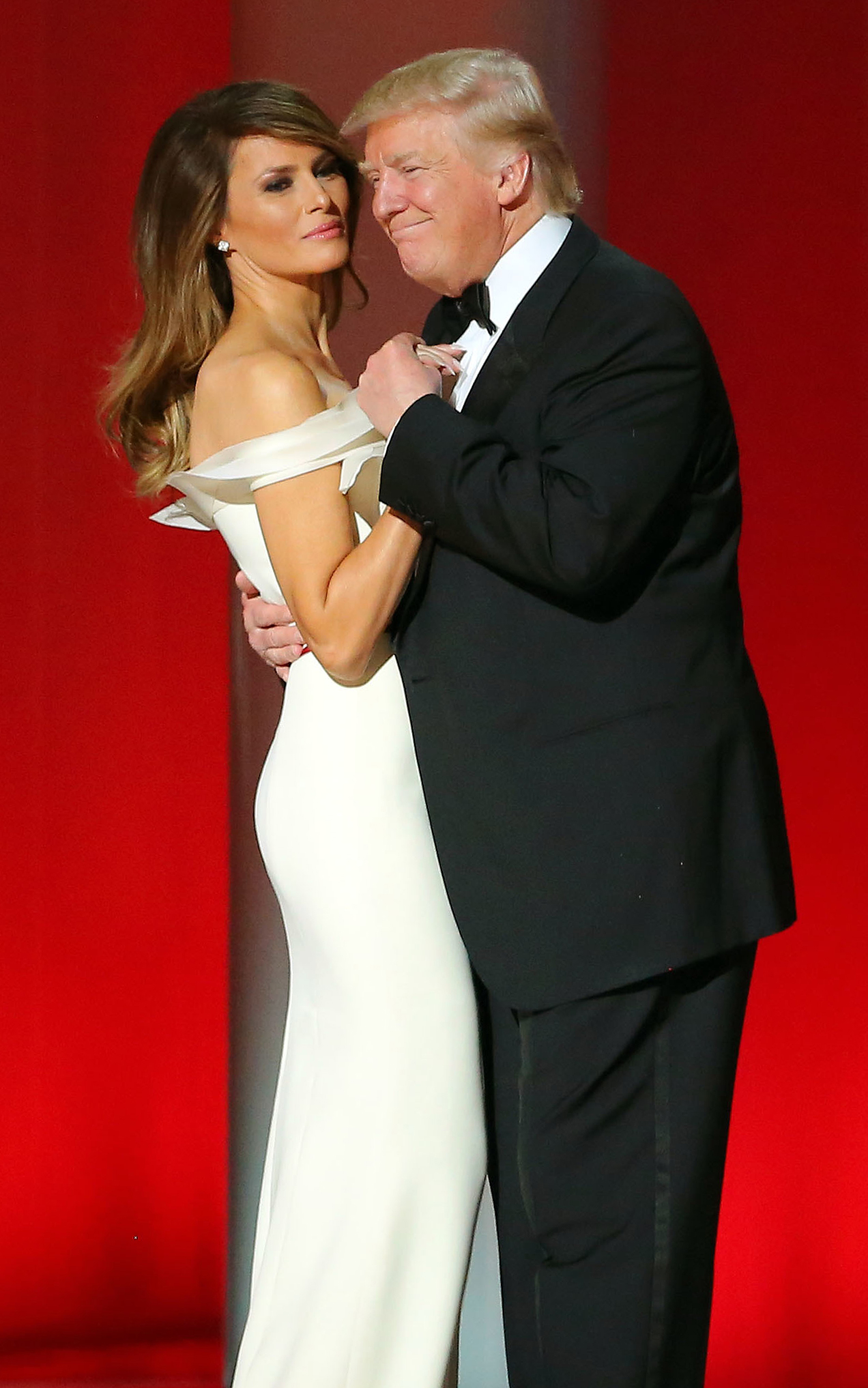
Donald Trump dancing with Melania Trump, who is wearing a gown by Hervé Pierre (2017).

In 1987, he received the first Christian Dior award from the Comité Colbert. The next year, he became assistant to Erik Mortensen at the Balmain fashion house. After the departure of Mortensen, Pierre created three of his own fashion collections in 1991 and 1992.

In addition to fashion, Pierre has also designed costumes for several opera houses. In 1992, he designed the costumes for Angelin Preljocaj's version of the ballet Parade for the Paris Opera Ballet and the Sydney Opera House, followed by costumes for Preljocaj's ballet Le Parc for Paris Opera Ballet in 1994. He has also designed costumes for New York City Ballet (1998) and Berliner Staatsoper (1999).

In the beginning of the 1990s, he moved to the United States where he worked for Oscar De la Renta . He served as creative director for Vera Wang from 1998 to 2000 and then moved to Bill Blass to work under then-creative director Lars Nilsson. After Bill Blass, he worked for Carolina Herrera for fourteen years, where he left a position as creative director in February 2016. His clients have included U.S. first ladies Hillary Clinton, Laura Bush and Michelle Obama.

Pierre has for several years been styling Melania Trump. In 2017, Pierre collaborated with her to design her gown for the Donald Trump inaugural balls. The dress was vanilla-colored and off-shoulder. It had a high slit, an arch across the torso and a red silk belt around the waistline. Pierre described Trump's contributions as both technical and aesthetic. The dress is exhibited at the National Museum of American History. Trump's Save America political action committee paid $132,000 to Pierre in 2022, after Trump left office, supposedly for "strategy consulting."

== See also ==
- List of fashion designers
- List of American artists
- List of costume designers
- List of French artists
