= Balmain (fashion house) =

French luxury fashion house

Pierre Balmain S.A.

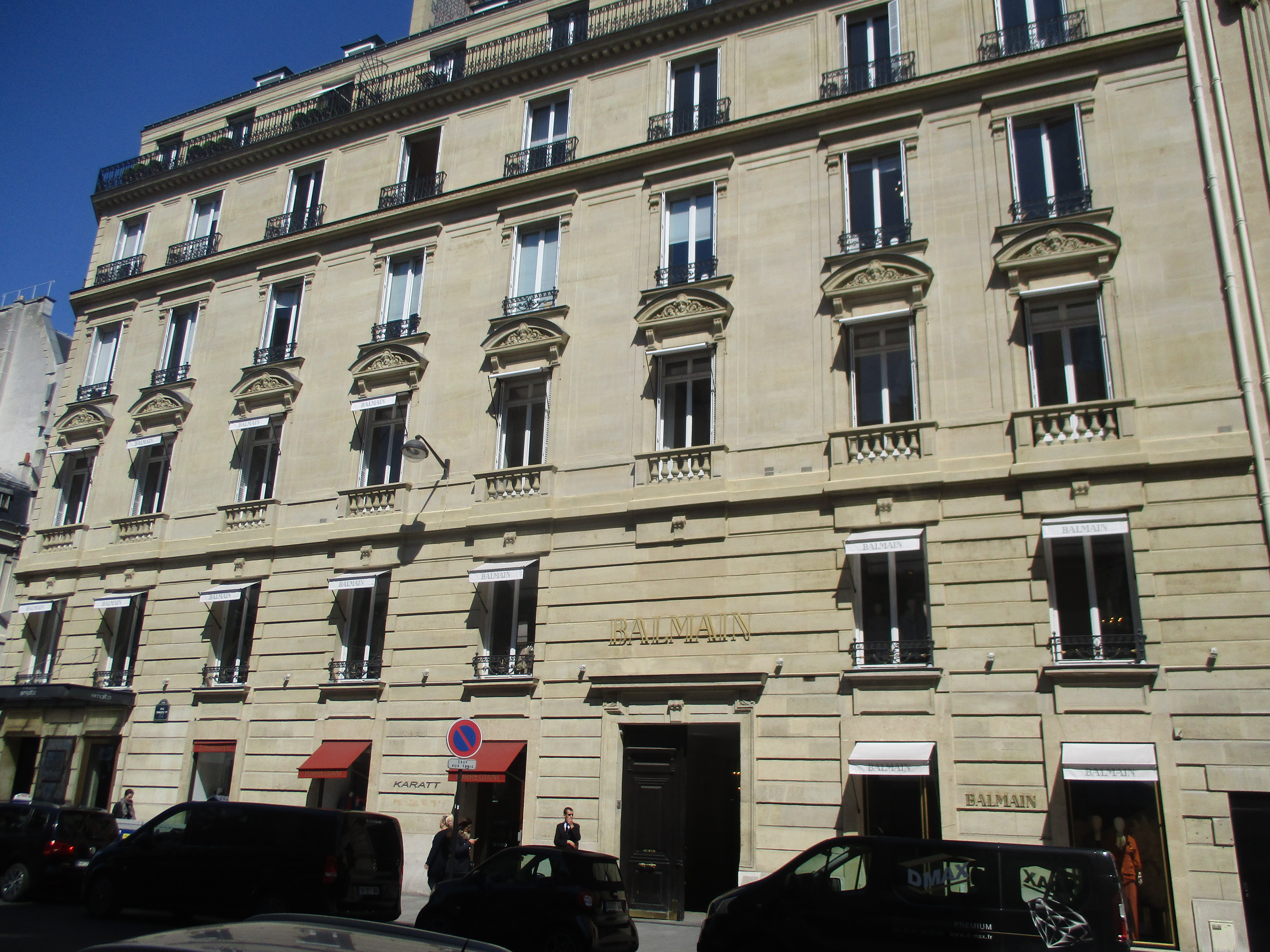
- Headquarters in Rue François-I, Paris
- Type: Société Anonyme
- Industry: Fashion
- Founded: 1945; 81 years ago
- Founder: Pierre Balmain
- Headquarters: Paris, France
- Area served: Worldwide
- Key people: Antonin Tron, Head Designer
- Products: Haute couture, ready-to-wear, perfume, jewellery
- Owner: Mayhoola for Investments
- Website: www.balmain.com

Pierre Balmain S.A. (French: [balmɛ̃]), trading as Balmain, is a French luxury fashion house that was founded by Pierre Balmain (1914–1982) in 1945.

It operates over 50 stores. Its primary flagship is located on Rue Saint-Honoré in Paris. Additional flagship locations are in Tokyo, New York City, London, and on Via Montenapoleone in Milan. This includes six stores in the United States including in on Madison Avenue in New York City, Bal Harbour, Las Vegas, and Melrose Place in Los Angeles.

Balmain was acquired by Qatari Crown investment firm Mayhoola for Investments for a figure reportedly close to €500 million ($548 million) in 2016. Prior to the deal, Balmain was 70 percent controlled by heirs of Alain Hivelin. The company does not regularly release financial information, but Les Echos estimated its revenue in 2015 at €120 million (about $136 million), growing from an estimated €30 million (about $34 million) in 2012. Balmain expected to reach a revenue of €150 million in 2017, 90% of which is generated by the wholesale channel, and was also investing more effort into direct retail. Balmain appointed Antonin Tron as its Creative Director starting November 2025.

== History ==
=== Pierre Balmain, 1945–1982 ===
Balmain was born in 1914 in France. His father owned a drapery business and his mother and sister owned a fashion boutique where he often worked after his father's death in 1921. He attended the École des Beaux-Arts in 1933–1934, with intent to study architecture but instead ended up spending the majority of his time designing dresses. After working for atelier Robert Piquet as a freelance artist and spending time with Edward Molyneux, he left school to work for Molyneux. In the late 1930s, he served in the French air force and the army pioneer corps. After peace was declared, he worked at Lucien Lelong and opened his own fashion house under his name at 44, rue François 1^{er} in Paris. He released his first collection in October 1945 and his first fragrance, Jolie Madame in 1949.

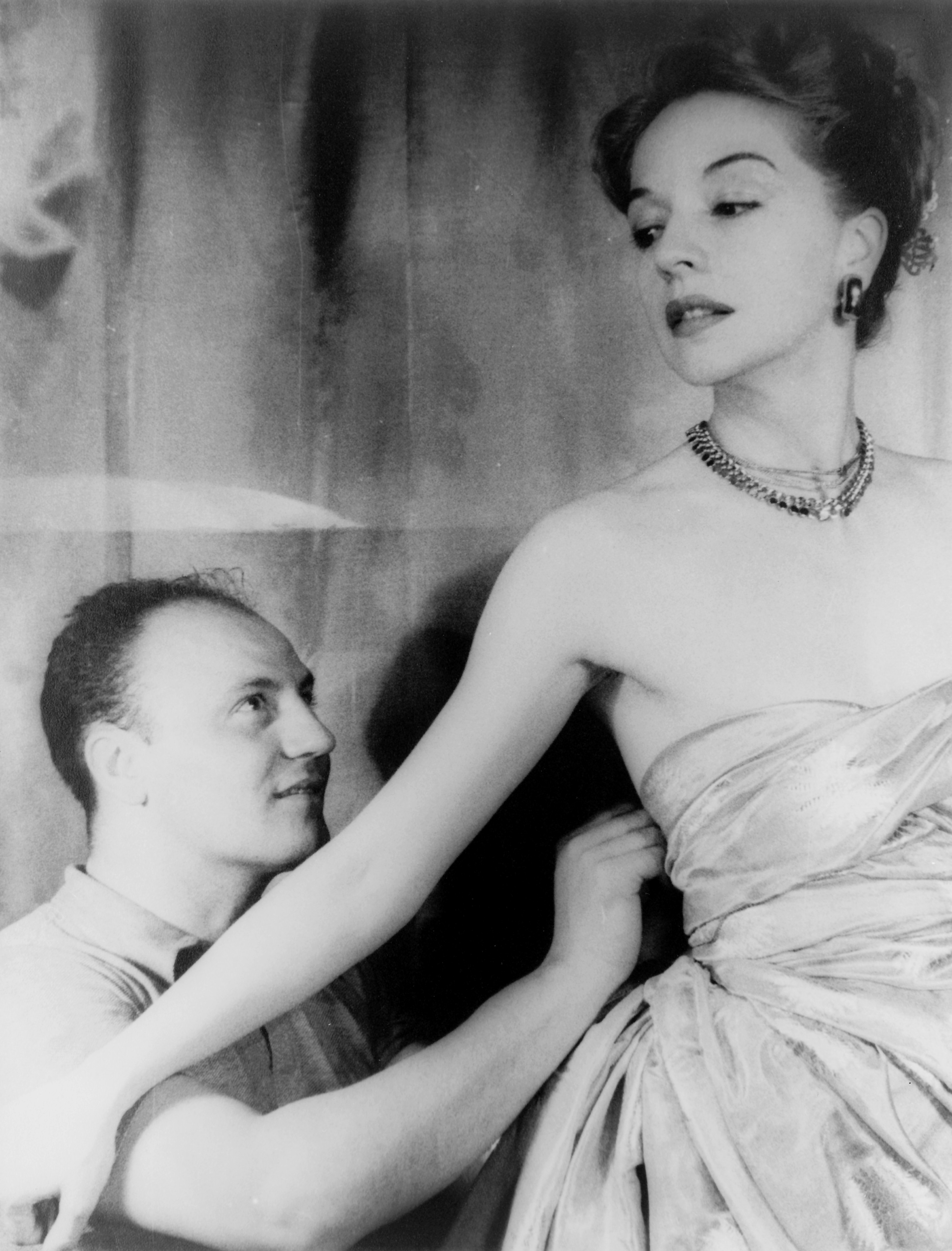
Pierre Balmain and the actress Ruth Ford, photographed by Carl Van Vechten, 1947

In the period following World War II, Pierre Balmain outfitted stars including Ava Gardner and Brigitte Bardot, the Nicaraguan first lady Hope Portocarrero, and Queen Sirikit of Thailand. Marlene Dietrich wore Balmain clothes that she selected in No Highway in the Sky (1951).

=== Erik Mortensen, 1982–1990 ===
After Balmain's death in 1982, the house was led by Erik Mortensen, described by Vogue as "Pierre Balmain's right hand". Mortensen had joined the house to work as Balmain's assistant in 1951. After succeeding Balmain, Mortensen worked to maintain the brand aesthetic in the ever-living world of couture while still maintaining the progressive spirit of creativity in the fashion industry. The Balmain house recruited Peggy Huynh Kinh in 1982 to provide artistic direction for women's ready-to-wear and women's and home accessories license studios. Eric Mortensen won two Golden Thimble awards for his haute couture collections, one for the Autumn/Winter 83/84 and one for the Autumn/Winter 87/88. He left the house in 1990.

=== Hervé Pierre, 1990–1992 ===
Designer Hervé Pierre took over as director of ready-to-wear and haute couture, during an economically slow time, until he was fired in 1992.

=== Oscar de la Renta, 1993–2002 ===
Possibly the most influential designer to take over at Balmain was Oscar de la Renta, who led the house between 1993 and 2002. Already a fashion veteran before joining Balmain, De la Renta brought a famous face to the brand Balmain. He lived in New York City most of his life, although he was born in the Dominican Republic and became a naturalized United States citizen in 1971. He fit into the Balmain design aesthetic, with an eye for detail and classic silhouettes. He, like Balmain, preferred modest and simple design rather than extremely ornamental and flashy styles. Couture had been suffering at the time since it was an extremely impractical business, so Oscar joined the brand in order to challenge himself and to help it through the beginning of the decline of couture.

=== Christophe Decarnin, 2005–2011 ===
After Oscar de la Renta's departure Christophe Decarnin joined the house in 2005. Decarnin favored expensive prices and flashy pieces that sharply contrasted with the label's reputation for its classic and luxurious designs. He was considered a "star designer", and the brand became more about his star status than about its clothes.

=== Olivier Rousteing, 2011–2025 ===
In April 2011, Balmain announced that Decarnin was to be replaced by Olivier Rousteing.

Rousteing had joined the company in 2009, after attending a prestigious French fashion school and working under Roberto Cavalli. While he liked Decarnin's aesthetic, he wanted to orient the label towards the finer aspects of French couture.

At the time of his appointment, Rousteing was a relatively unknown designer. He has since been credited with adding an "Asian influence" to the clothing, as Asia comprises a huge part of the brand's buyers.

In April 2016, Balmain opened its New York flagship store in Soho.

On June 22, 2016, Mayhoola Investments acquired Balmain from its previous owners for reportedly more than 460 million euros ($522 million).

In 2017, Rousteing debuted Balmain's first accessory line.

On December 4, 2018, Rousteing introduced Balmain's new logo.

In 2019, Balmain partnered with Cara Delevingne and Puma on Puma X Balmain, a 35-piece athletic wear collection.

In September 2023, Rousteing announced that a van holding over 50 designs for the fall 2023 show during Paris Fashion Week had been robbed while en route to the Balmain studio. Despite the setback, he was able to successfully present a show filled with flowers and a message that "love is all".

On November 5, 2025, Rousteing announced his departure from Balmain, after 14 years as its creative director.

=== Antonin Tron, 2025– ===
On November 12, 2025, Antonin Tron was announced as the new creative director of Balmain.

== Other activities ==
As of 2012, 50% of the company's total income was from license royalties.

=== Diffusion lines ===
In 1994, Balmain licensed Societe Creations Michel Firer to manufacture and distribute a diffusion collection of women's ready-to-wear.

In 2011, Balmain launched its Pierre Balmain diffusion line for men's and womenswear. By 2013, Balmain terminated its agreement with Italian manufacturer Ittierre SpA for the production of Pierre Balmain and brought it in-house. The line was ultimately discontinued in 2018.

In November 2015, Balmain released their one-off collaboration with the international Swedish retail store H&M.

=== Fragrances ===
In 2012, Balmain entered into a licensing, development and production agreement with Interparfums for 12 years. By 2017, Rousteing terminated this contract due to declining sales. In 2022, Balmain announced a new long-term licensing agreement with Estée Lauder Companies.

=== Cosmetics ===
In 2013, Balmain introduced their Care and Styling for Hair Couture.

In 2017, Balmain introduced a lipstick collection in collaboration with L’Oreal.

In 2019, Balmain announced the capsule makeup collection, KYLIE X BALMAIN, a collaboration with cosmetics entrepreneur, Kylie Jenner. Jenner was also named Artistic Director for Makeup for the Spring-Summer 2020 Runway Collection.

In 2023, Balmain Hair celebrated its 50th anniversary and was lauded by Vogue.

=== Lingerie ===
In 2017, Balmain launched a capsule collection with Victoria's Secret.

=== Jewellery ===
In 2022, Balmain launched its first fine jewellery collection.

== Head designers of Balmain ==
- 1945–1982: Pierre Balmain
- 1982–1986: Peggy Huynh Kinh
- 1982–1990: Erik Mortensen
- 1990–1992: Hervé Pierre Braillard
- 1993–2002: Oscar de la Renta
- 2002-2003: Laurent Mercier
- 2003–2006: Christophe Lebourg
- 2006–2011: Christophe Decarnin
- 2011–2025: Olivier Rousteing
- 2025–present: Antonin Tron

From 1947 to 1976 Balmain's directrice (director) was Ginette Spanier. Alain Hivelin was chairman and majority owner of Balmain starting in 2004 until his death in 2014.

== Philanthropy ==
In 2018, Balmain joined forces with (RED) to auction off its custom-made looks for that year's Met Gala, with 100% of the proceeds going toward the Global Fund to Fight AIDS, Tuberculosis and Malaria. The brand has since cooperated with (RED) on various occasions.
