= Vivienne Tam =

American fashion designer (born 1957)

Vivienne Tam 譚燕玉
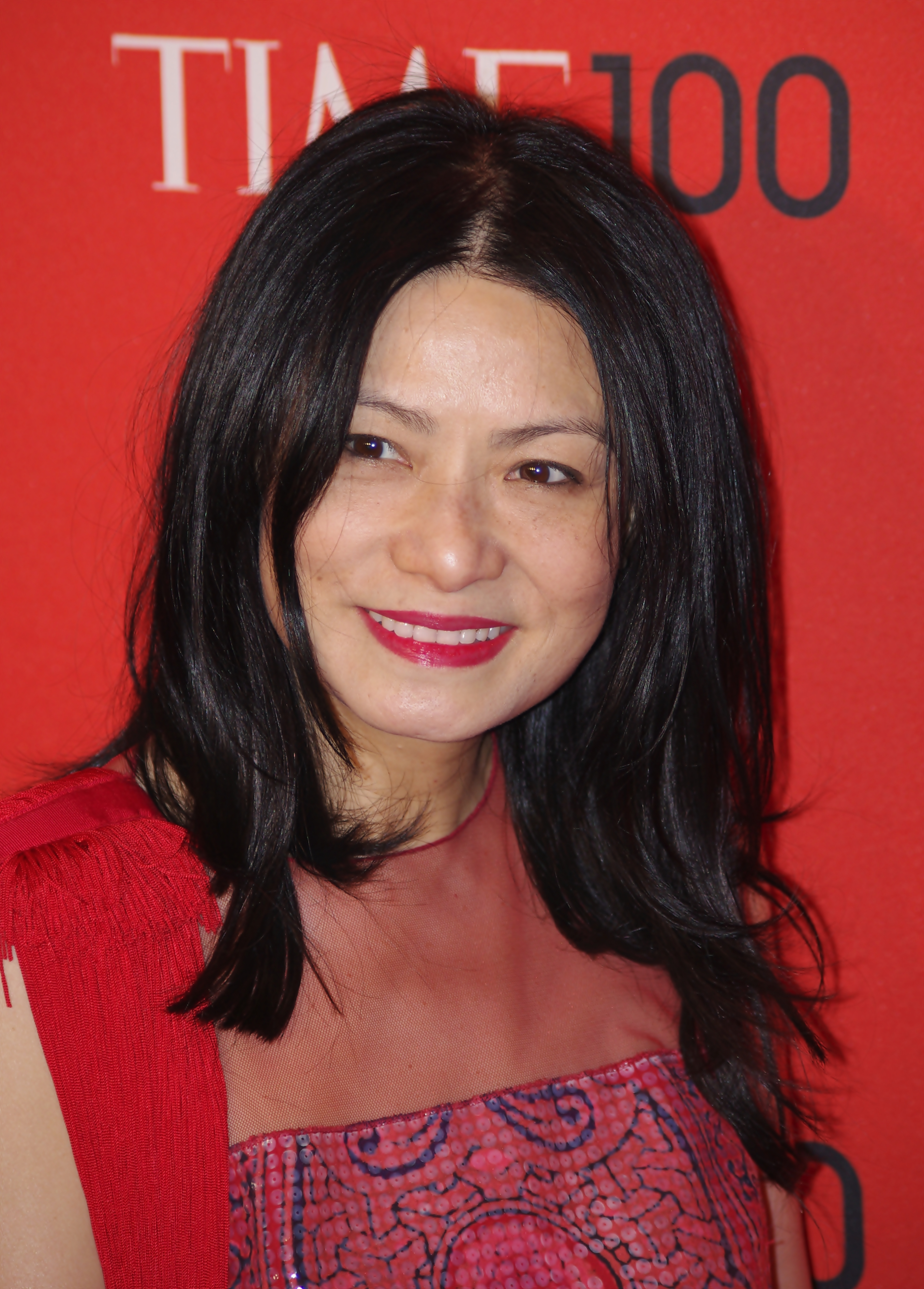
- Tam at the 2011 Time 100 gala
- Born: Tam Yin Yok; 28 November 1957 (age 68); Guangzhou, Guangdong, China
- Education: Hong Kong Polytechnic University
- Occupation: Fashion designer
- Website: viviennetam.com

Vivienne Tam (traditional Chinese: 譚燕玉; simplified Chinese: 谭燕玉; Jyutping: taam4 jin3juk6; pinyin: Tán Yànyù, born 28 November 1957) is a fashion designer based in New York City. She was born in Guangzhou, Guangdong, China, and moved to Hong Kong at the age of three. She attended the Hong Kong Polytechnic University.

Tam's fashion brand is named after her and is inspired by Chinese culture, design, modern fashion, and east–west fusion. The theme of her first collection was EAST WIND CODE. She authored China Chic, a book in which she explored the ways in which Chinese style meets Western style and described elements of the Chinese culture like her mother's cheongsam that had the most impact on her. She also discussed how Chinese culture intertwined with Western style and influenced her future work. She has worked with Hewlett-Packard on a special Vivienne Tam range of designer netbook computers, such as a version of the HP Mini 1000 and the HP Mini 210. Tam also appeared on dressup site Stardoll where she has her own suite and brand name. She has also designed dresses for the characters in the Animax movie LaMB.

Tam debuted her collaboration with Chinese jewelry brand TSL at her Spring 2013 fashion show.

== Early life ==
Vivienne Tam was born in Guangzhou, Guangdong, China. When Tam was three years old, her family left the People's Republic of China and moved to Hong Kong. The experiences of Vivienne's parents as wealthy landowners during Mao Zedong's rule influenced designer's future collections and inspired her to create her signature "MAO" collection. Tam discovered her love of fashion at an early age. She was inspired by watching her mother making clothes for her family. By the age of 8, she was making her own outfits and dressing herself and her siblings, even for Lunar New Year. She attended a Catholic school, where she learned English, even though she still spoke Cantonese at home with her family. She then went to study fashion design in Hong Kong Polytechnic University where she received her Higher Diploma in Fashion Design.

== Work ==
After finishing her degree she moved to New York City to launch her business. Her company, East Wind Code, was established in March 1982. (East Wind Code means "good luck and prosperity" in Chinese) Her clothes were being made in Hong Kong, however she had a work space on West 38th Street, NYC. After a decade, she ended up changing the name of her business to "Vivienne Tam" before her first runway show at New York Fashion Week.

=== The East-West fusion ===
In the world of fashion, Tam is known for her "East meets West" designs. Her life in Hong Kong and family history in China made Tam a "bridge between two cultures." Tam believes that the world is ruled by the yin-yang philosophy, so her collections often reflect this belief, merging the traditional and modern cultures.

Through her works, she wants to spread awareness in the West about the beauty of Chinese culture and national clothing. Vivienne's Tam collections highlight the unique character of Chinese culture. She uses them as a tool to show that Chinese national clothing is not just clothing but also a type of art, creativity, and a reflection of years of history.

== Works and collections ==
Her first few collections were heavily influenced by traditional Chinese prints, fabrics, and designs. Her clothes were popular among fashion-forward women interested in Asian influence designs.

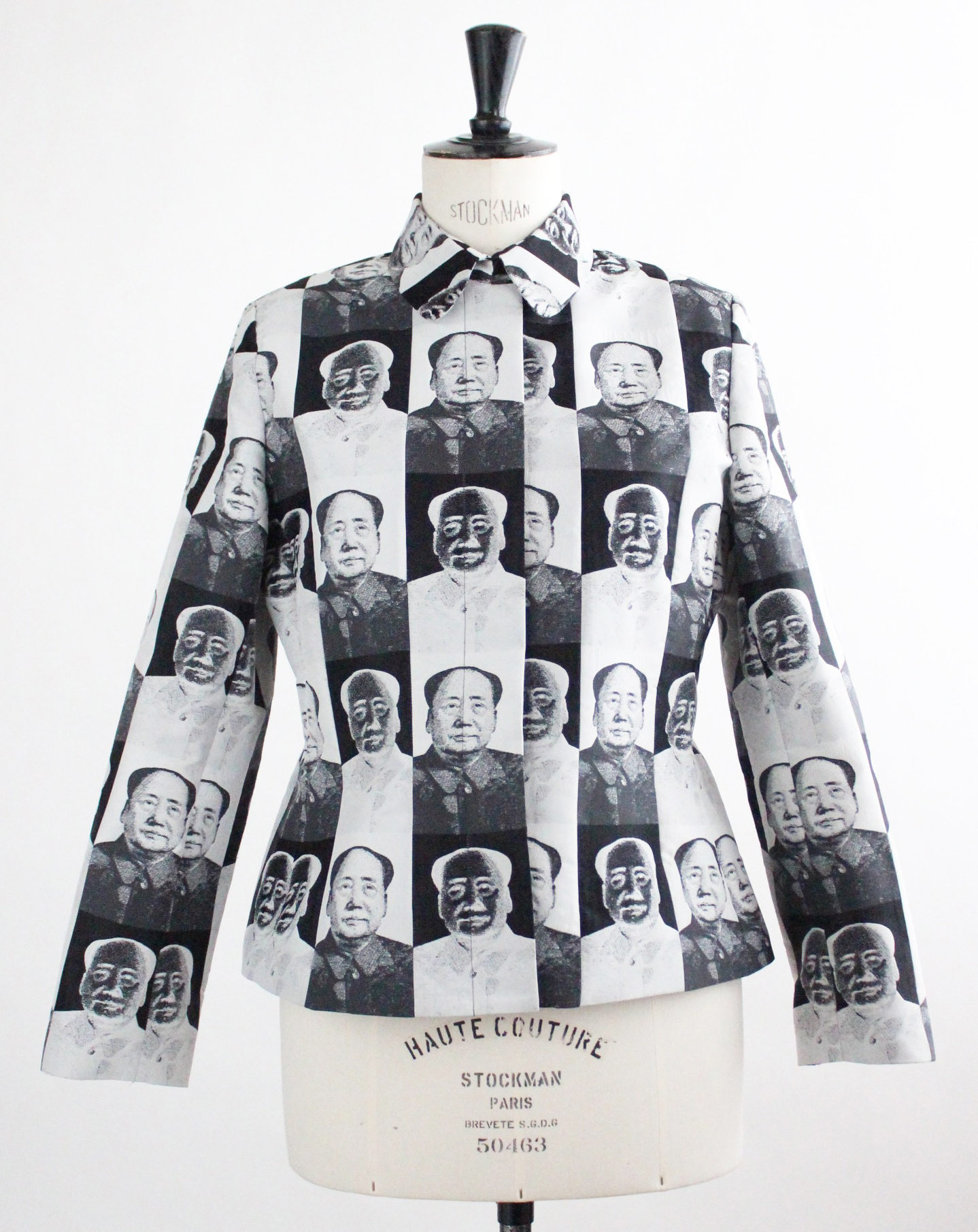
Tam 'Mao' Jacket Spring/Summer 1995 Adnan Ege Kutay Collection

=== MAO ===
In 1995, she teamed up with artist Zhang Hongtu for her collection "MAO". Both Tam's and Zhang's families were denounced by Mao's regime, so their joint collection signifies "a kind of mental therapy," as Zhang puts it. The collection included several portraits of Mao that depicted him in comical light. For example, one of the images "Mao so Young" shows him with pigtails and gingham dress, and another image called "Ow Mao" shows Mao with a bee on his nose. She produced a series of printed t-shirts with these humorous images. Another collection included garments inspired by "Zhongshan suit", also known as the "Mao suit", since Mao regularly wore suits with the similar style. These suits featured black-and-white images of Mao that fully covered the garment. Tam regarded this collection as "more serious, symbolizing the positive and negative effects Mao had on the Chinese culture" In the Asian American community this created some controversy as they felt it was in poor taste, since many had died under his power. She even had difficulty finding a manufacturer in Hong Kong that would take the job, and even several minor protests by her store. Despite the controversy in the launching of this collection, some of the pieces became permanent artworks in the Andy Warhol Museum in Pittsburgh, Pennsylvania, and even in the collections of the Los Angeles's Fashion Institute of Design and Merchandising Museum, the Texas Fashion Collection, and New York's Museum at the Fashion Institute of Technology.

=== Year of the Dragon ===
This following collection was inspired from Asian Culture, and released in Spring of 2001, featuring images of Buddha. She explained that "The Buddha image has always been in the temple, and I wanted to make it more accessible to the people."

=== Expansion of her business ===
In 1996, she expanded her clothing empire and created a shoe line for Candie's, and the year after she opened her first store in NYC, then a branch in LA, Tokyo, and Kobe, Japan.

=== 2017 Spring and Summer collections ===
In Fall of 2016, Tam debuted her Spring and Summer collection at New York Fashion Week featuring iconic Houston logos. Tam partnered with Visit Houston and Asian Wives Club to promote a new perspective on the city of Houston.

=== 2018 Fall/Winter collection ===
In February 2018, Tam presented her Fall/Winter 2018 collection, inspired by a "spiritual journey" through the Himalayas to Tibet, in Gallery I of Spring Studios.

== See also ==
- Chinese Americans in New York City
