= Fedora Linux release history =

Fedora OS release dates

Fedora Linux is a popular Linux distribution developed by the Fedora Project. Fedora attempts to maintain a six-month release schedule, offering new versions in spring and fall, although some releases have experienced minor delays.

== Release history ==
Releases of Fedora Linux
Version	Release	End-of-life	Kernel (Note: Latest version per release.)	GNOME
1 (Yarrow)	2003-11-05	2004-09-20	2.4.22	2.4
2 (Tettnang)	2004-05-18	2005-04-11	2.6.5	2.6
3 (Heidelberg)	2004-11-08	2006-01-16	2.6.9	2.8
4 (Stentz)	2005-06-13	2006-08-07	2.6.11	2.10
5 (Bordeaux)	2006-03-20	2007-07-02	2.6.15	2.14
6 (Zod)	2006-10-24	2007-12-07	2.6.18	2.16
7 (Moonshine)	2007-05-31	2008-06-13	2.6.23	2.18
8 (Werewolf)	2007-11-08	2009-01-07	2.6.26	2.20
9 (Sulphur)	2008-05-13	2009-07-10	2.6.27	2.22
10 (Cambridge)	2008-11-25	2009-12-17	2.6.27	2.24
11 (Leonidas)	2009-06-09	2010-06-25	2.6.30	2.26
12 (Constantine)	2009-11-17	2010-12-02	2.6.32	2.28
13 (Goddard)	2010-05-25	2011-06-24	2.6.34	2.30
14 (Laughlin)	2010-11-02	2011-12-09	2.6.35	2.32
15 (Lovelock)	2011-05-24	2012-06-26	2.6.43	3.0
16 (Verne)	2011-11-08	2013-02-12	3.6	3.2
17 (Beefy Miracle)	2012-05-29	2013-07-30	3.9	3.4
18 (Spherical Cow)	2013-01-15	2014-01-14	3.11	3.6
19 (Schrödinger's Cat)	2013-07-02	2015-01-06	3.14	3.8
20 (Heisenbug)	2013-12-17	2015-06-23	3.19	3.10
21	2014-12-09	2015-12-01	4.1	3.14
22	2015-05-26	2016-07-19	4.4	3.16
23	2015-11-03	2016-12-20	4.8	3.18
24	2016-06-21	2017-08-08	4.11	3.20
25	2016-11-22	2017-12-12	4.13	3.22
26	2017-07-11	2018-05-29	4.16	3.24
27	2017-11-14	2018-11-30	4.18	3.26
28	2018-05-01	2019-05-28	5.0	3.28
29	2018-10-30	2019-11-26	5.3	3.30
30	2019-04-30	2020-05-26	5.6	3.32
31	2019-10-29	2020-11-24	5.8	3.34
32	2020-04-28	2021-05-25	5.11	3.36
33	2020-10-27	2021-11-30	5.14	3.38
34	2021-04-27	2022-06-07	5.17	40
35	2021-11-02	2022-12-13	6.0	41
36	2022-05-10	2023-05-16	6.2	42
37	2022-11-15	2023-12-05	6.5	43
38	2023-04-18	2024-05-21	6.8	44
39	2023-11-07	2024-11-26	6.11	45
40	2024-04-23	2025-05-13	6.14	46
41	2024-10-29	2025-12-15	6.17	47
42 (Adams)	2025-04-15	2026-05-27	6.19	48
43	2025-10-28	2026-12-09	7.2	49
44	2026-04-28	2027-06-02	7.2	50
45	2026-11-03	2027-12-08	7.2	51
46	2027-04-20		7.4	
47	2027-10-26			
Legend: Unsupported Supported Latest version Preview version Future version

=== Fedora Core 1 ===
Fedora Core 1 was the first version of Fedora and was released on November 6, 2003. It was codenamed Yarrow. Fedora Core 1 was based on Red Hat Linux 9.

Some of the features in Fedora Core 1 included:

- Version 2.4.19 of the Linux kernel;
- Version 2.4 of the GNOME Desktop Environment (GNOME);
- Version 3.1 of the K Desktop Environment (KDE).

=== Fedora Core 2 ===
Fedora Core 2 was released on May 18, 2004, codenamed Tettnang.

Some of the new features in Fedora Core 2 included:

- Version 2.6 of the Linux kernel;
- Version 2.6 of the GNOME Desktop Environment (GNOME);
- Version 3.2 of the K Desktop Environment (KDE);
- Security-Enhanced Linux (SELinux);
- X.Org Server replaced XFree86 due to license changes with the latter project. (X.Org Server is a merger of the previous official X11R6 release, which additionally included a number of updates to Xrender, Xft, Xcursor, fontconfig libraries, and other significant improvements, with XFree86 4.4 RC 2, the final version before the license change.)

SELinux was disabled by default due to concerns that it radically altered the way that Fedora Core ran.

=== Fedora Core 3 ===
Fedora Core 3 was released on November 8, 2004, codenamed Heidelberg.

Some of the new features in Fedora Core 3 included:

- The Mozilla Firefox web browser;
- Support for Indic scripts;
- GNU GRUB boot loader;
- Version 2.8 of the GNOME desktop environment (GNOME);
- Version 3.3 of the K Desktop Environment (KDE);
- New Fedora Extras repository;
- SELinux enabled by default.

This release deprecated the LILO boot loader in favor of GNU GRUB. Security-Enhanced Linux (SELinux) now had a new targeted policy, which was less strict than the policy used in Fedora Core 2.

=== Fedora Core 4 ===
Fedora Core 4 was released on June 13, 2005, with the codename Stentz. It shipped with Linux 2.6.11, KDE 3.4 and GNOME 2.10. This version introduced the new Clearlooks theme, which was inspired by the Red Hat Bluecurve theme. It also shipped with the OpenOffice.org 2.0 office suite, as well as Xen, a high performance and secure open source virtualization framework. It also introduced support for the PowerPC CPU architecture, and over 80 new policies for Security-Enhanced Linux (SELinux).

=== Fedora Core 5 ===
This Core release introduced specific artwork that defined it. This is a trend that has continued in later Fedora versions.

Fedora Core 5 was released on March 20, 2006, with the codename Bordeaux, and introduced the Fedora Bubbles artwork. It was the first Fedora release to include Mono and tools built with it such as Beagle, F-Spot and Tomboy. It also introduced new package management tools such as pup and pirut (see Yellowdog Updater, Modified). It also was the first Fedora release not to include the long deprecated (but kept for compatibility) LinuxThreads, replaced by the Native POSIX Thread Library.

=== Fedora Core 6 ===
Fedora Core 6 was released on October 24, 2006, codenamed Zod. This release introduced the Fedora DNA artwork, replacing the Fedora Bubbles artwork used in Fedora Core 5. The codename is derived from the villain, General Zod, from the Superman DC Comic Books. This version introduced support for the Compiz compositing window manager and AIGLX (a technology that enables GL-accelerated effects on a standard desktop). It shipped with Firefox 1.5 as the default web browser, and Smolt, a tool that allows users to inform developers about the hardware they use. Red Hat Enterprise Linux 5 and other derivatives are based on Fedora Core 6.

=== Fedora 7 ===
Fedora 7, codenamed Moonshine, was released on May 31, 2007. The biggest difference between Fedora Core 6 and Fedora 7 was the merging of the Red Hat "Core" and Community "Extras" repositories, dropping "Core" from the name "Fedora Core," and the new build system put in place to manage those packages. This release used entirely new build and compose tools that enabled the user to create fully customized Fedora distributions via a package named Revisor that could also include packages from any third-party provider.

There were three official spins available for Fedora 7:

- Live – two Live CDs (one for GNOME and one for KDE);
- Fedora – a DVD that includes all the major packages available at shipping;
- Everything – simply an installation tree for use by yum and Internet installations.

Fedora 7 featured GNOME 2.18 and KDE 3.5, a new theme entitled Flying High, OpenOffice.org 2.2 and Firefox 2.0. This theme included a complete refresh of the various icons and symbols. Fast user switching was fully integrated and enabled by default. Also, there were a number of updates to SELinux, including a new setroubleshoot tool for debugging SELinux security notifications, and a new, comprehensive system-config-selinux tool for fine-tuning the SELinux setup.

=== Fedora 8 ===
Fedora 8, codenamed Werewolf, was released on November 8, 2007.

Some of the new features and updates in Fedora 8 included:

- PulseAudio – a sound daemon that allows different applications to control the audio. Fedora was the first distribution to enable it by default.
- system-config-firewall – a new firewall configuration tool that replaces system-config-security level from previous releases.
- Codeina – a tool that guides users using content under proprietary or patent-encumbered formats to purchase codecs from fluendo; it is an optional component that may be uninstalled in favor of GStreamer codec plug-ins which are free of charge.
- IcedTea – a project that attempts to bring OpenJDK to Fedora by replacing encumbered code.
- NetworkManager – faster, more reliable connections; better security (through the use of the keyring); clearer display of wireless networks; better D-Bus integration.
- Better laptop support – enhancements to the kernel to reduce battery load, disabling of background cron jobs when running on the battery, and additional wireless drivers.

Due to criticism regarding inconsistent UI in Fedora 7 and its previous versions, Fedora 8 also included a new desktop artwork entitled Infinity and a new desktop theme named Nodoka, replacing the Flying High theme in the predecessor. Infinity was the first to provide a wallpaper that could change to reflect the time of day, a feature that remained with later editions and spilled over to other Linux 'flavors' and even other operating systems.

In February 2008, a new Xfce Live CD "spin" was announced for the x86 and x86-64 architectures. This Live CD version uses the Xfce desktop environment, which aims to be fast and lightweight, while still being visually appealing and easy to use. Like the GNOME and KDE spins, the Xfce spin can be installed to the hard disk.

=== Fedora 9 ===
Fedora 9, codenamed Sulphur, was released on May 24, 2008.

Some of the new features of Fedora 9 included:

- GNOME 2.22.
- KDE Plasma 4.0, which is the default interface as part of the KDE spin.
- OpenJDK 6 has replaced IcedTea.
- PackageKit is included as a front-end to yum, and as the default package manager.
- One Second X allows the X Window System to perform a cold start from the command line in nearly one second; similarly, shutdown of X should be as quick.
- Introduction of Upstart
- Many improvements to the Anaconda installer; among these features, it now supports resizing ext2, ext3 and NTFS file systems, and can create and install Fedora to encrypted file systems.
- Firefox 3.0 beta 5 is included in this release, and the 3.0 package was released as an update the same day as the general release.
- Perl 5.10, which features a smaller memory footprint and other improvements.
- Data Persistence in USB images.

Fedora 9 featured a new artwork entitled Waves which, like Infinity in Fedora 8, changes the wallpaper to reflect the time of day.

=== Fedora 10 ===
Fedora 10, codenamed Cambridge, was released on November 25, 2008. It flaunts the new Solar artwork. Its features include:

- Faster startup using one Plymouth splash screen instead of the version-specific Red Hat Graphical Boot that was previously used, including Red Hat Enterprise Linux 6 and other derivatives that are based on Fedora 10 and higher.
- Support for ext4 filesystem
- Sugar Desktop Environment
- LXDE Desktop Environment (LXDE Spin)
- GNOME 2.24
- KDE Plasma 4.1 (KDE Spin)
- OpenOffice.org 3.0

=== Fedora 11 ===
Fedora 11, codenamed Leonidas, was released on June 9, 2009. This was the first release whose artwork is determined by the name instead of by users voting on themes.

Some of the features in Fedora 11 are:

- ext4 as the default file system
- experimental Btrfs activated by IcantbelieveitsnotBTR command line option at bootup
- faster bootup aimed at 20 seconds.
- GCC 4.4
- GNOME 2.26
- KDE Plasma 4.2 (KDE Spin)
- 2.6.29 Linux kernel
- Eclipse 3.4.2
- Netbeans 6.5
- nVidia kernel modesetting through the open source nouveau (graphics) driver
- OpenOffice 3.1
- Python 2.6
- Xfce to 4.6 (Xfce Spin)
- X server 1.6
- fprint – support for systems with fingerprint readers

=== Fedora 12 ===
Fedora 12, codenamed Constantine, was released on November 17, 2009.

Some of the features in Fedora 12 are:

- Optimized performance. All software packages on 32-bit (x86_32) architecture have been compiled for i686 systems
- Improved webcam support (Cheese)
- Better video codec with a newer version of Ogg Theora
- Audio improvements
- Automatic bug reporting tool (abrt)
- Bluetooth on demand
- Enhanced NetworkManager to manage broadband
- Many virtualization enhancements (KVM, libvirt, libguestfs)
- ext4 used even for the boot partition
- Moblin interface
- Yum-presto plugin providing Delta RPMs for updates by default
- New compression algorithm (XZ, the new LZMA format) in RPM packages for smaller and faster updates
- Experimental 3D support for ATI R600/R700 cards
- GCC 4.4
- SystemTap 1.0 with Eclipse integration
- GNOME 2.28
- GNOME Shell preview
- KDE Plasma 4.3. Plasma 4.4 was pushed to the updates repository on February 27, 2010 (KDE Spin)
- 2.6.31 Linux kernel; kernel version 2.6.32 was pushed to the updates repository on February 27, 2010
- X server 1.7 with Multi-Pointer X (MPX) support
- NetBeans 6.7
- PHP 5.3
- Rakudo Perl 6 compiler

=== Fedora 13 ===
Fedora 13, codenamed "Goddard", was released on May 25, 2010. During early development, Fedora project leader Paul Frields anticipated "looking at the fit and finish issues. We have tended to build a really tight ship with Fedora, but now we want to make the décor in the cabins a little more sumptuous and to polish the deck chairs and railings."

Features of Fedora 13 include:

- Automatic printer driver installation
- Automatic language pack installation
- Redesigned user account tool
- Color management to calibrate monitors and scanners
- Experimental 3D support for NVIDIA video cards
- A new way to install Fedora over the Internet
- SSSD authentication for users
- Updates to NFS
- Inclusion of Zarafa Open Source edition
- System rollback for the Btrfs file system
- Better SystemTap probes
- Support for the entire Java EE 6 spec in Netbeans 6.8
- KDE Plasma PulseAudio Integration
- New command-line interface for NetworkManager

=== Fedora 14 ===
Fedora 14, codenamed Laughlin, was released on October 29, 2010. It was the last to use the GNOME 2 desktop environment (now forked as MATE). GNOME 2 had been the desktop environment of the operating system since its inception in 2003.

Features of Fedora 14 included:

- Updated Boost to the upstream 1.44 release
- Addition of the D compiler (LDC) and D standard runtime library (Tango)
- Concurrent release of Fedora 14 on the Amazon EC2 cloud
- Updated Fedora's Eclipse stack to Helios releases
- Updated Erlang to the upstream R14 release
- Replacement of libjpeg with libjpeg-turbo
- Inclusion of virt-v2v tool
- Inclusion of Spice framework for VDI deployment
- Updates to Rakudo Star implementation of Perl 6
- NetBeans IDE updated to the 6.9 release
- Inclusion of ipmiutil system management tool
- Inclusion of a tech preview of the GNOME Shell environment
- Python 2.7

=== Fedora 15 ===
Fedora 15, codenamed Lovelock, was released on May 24, 2011. Features of Fedora 15 include:

- Inclusion of GNOME 3 desktop
- LibreOffice as a replacement of OpenOffice.org
- Inclusion of GNU Compiler Collection 4.6
- Responsibility for booting is taken up by Systemd
- LLVMpipe replacing Mesa software rasterizer
- Inclusion of BoxGrinder software
- Support for dynamic firewalls with firewalld
- Inclusion of PowerTOP 2.x
- Adoption of Consistent Network Device Naming
- Improved support for encrypted home directories

=== Fedora 16 ===
Fedora 16, codenamed "Verne", was released on November 8, 2011. Fedora 16 was also dedicated to the memory of Dennis Ritchie, who died about a month before the release.

Some of the features of Fedora 16 included:

- Linux kernel 3.1.0
- Inclusion of GNOME 3.2.1 desktop
- Updated to latest KDE Software Compilation 4.7.2
- GRUB2 became the default bootloader
- Ext4 driver used for Ext3 and Ext2 file systems
- HAL daemon removed in favour of udisks, upower, and libudev
- Unification of the user interfaces for all problem reporting programs and mechanisms
- Virtualization improvements including OpenStack and Aeolus Conductor
- Fedora uses UID/GIDs up through 999 for system accounts
- Enhanced cloud support including Condor Cloud, HekaFS, and pacemaker-cloud

=== Fedora 17 ===
Fedora 17, codenamed "Beefy Miracle", which was released on May 29, 2012.

Some of the features of Fedora 17 include:

- Linux kernel 3.3.4
- Integrated UEFI support
- Inclusion of GNOME 3.4 desktop, offering software rendering support for GNOME Shell
- Updated to latest KDE Software Compilation 4.8.3
- A new filesystem structure moving more things to /usr
- Removable disks are now mounted under /run/media due to a change in udisks
- systemd-logind replaces ConsoleKit, offering multiseat improvements
- Inclusion of the libvirt sandbox; virt-manager now supports USB pass-through
- Services now use private temp directories to improve security

=== Fedora 18 ===
Fedora 18, codenamed "Spherical Cow", was released on January 15, 2013.

Some of the features of Fedora 18 include:

- Linux kernel 3.6.10
- Support for UEFI Secure Boot
- A rewrite of the Anaconda installer
- A new system upgrade utility called FedUp
- Default desktop upgraded to GNOME 3.6.3
- Updated to KDE Plasma 4.9 and Xfce 4.10
- Inclusion of MATE and Cinnamon desktops
- Better Active Directory support through FreeIPA v3
- Support for NetworkManager hotspots
- Support for 256 color terminals by default
- Offline system updates utilizing systemd and PackageKit
- Better cloud computing support with the inclusion of Eucalyptus, Heat, and OpenStack Folsom
- firewalld replaces system-config-firewall as default

=== Fedora 19 ===
Fedora 19, codenamed "Schrödinger's Cat", was released on July 2, 2013. Red Hat Enterprise Linux 7 and other derivatives are based on Fedora 19.

Some of the features of Fedora 19 include:

- Further improvements to the new Anaconda installer
- A new initial setup application
- Support to application checkpointing through CRIU
- Default desktop upgraded to GNOME 3.8
- Updated to KDE Plasma 4.10 and MATE 1.6
- MariaDB has replaced MySQL
- GCC has been updated to version 4.8
- RPM Package Manager has been updated to version 4.11
- Includes the new Developers Assistant tool
- Numerous upstream improvements to firewall and systemd
- Improved cloud support, including better compatibility with Amazon EC2

=== Fedora 20 ===
Fedora 20, the last regularly codenamed release named "Heisenbug", was released on December 17, 2013.

Some of the features of Fedora 20 include:

- GNOME 3.10
- ARM as primary architecture in addition to x86 and x86_64
- Replacement of the gnome-packagekit frontends with a new application installer, tentatively named gnome-software

Shortly after the release of Fedora 20, the Fedora project team decided to abolish the codename system completely due to inconvenience, which meant that future Fedora releases would only be referred to by their version number.

=== Fedora 21 ===
Fedora 21, the first version without a codename, was released on December 9, 2014.

- GNOME desktop 3.14 with several minor visual enhancements
- Due to concerns regarding lack of direction, Fedora introduced three flavors, each providing different specialized sets of preinstalled packages depending on use purpose: Workstation, Server, and Cloud.

=== Fedora 22 ===
Fedora 22 was released on May 26, 2015.

Major features include:

- GNOME 3.16 with a completely redesigned notification system and automatically hiding scrollbars
- DNF replacing yum as the default package manager
- The default display server for the GNOME Display Manager being Wayland instead of Xorg

=== Fedora 23 ===
Fedora 23 was released on November 3, 2015.

- GNOME desktop 3.18
- Inclusion of the LibreOffice 5 update
- The Fedora release updater, FedUp, was integrated into DNF. Thus, FedUp was deprecated.
- It uses a Python3 (specifically python3.4.3) as the operating system's default Python implementation.

See also.

=== Fedora 24 ===
Fedora 24 was released on June 21, 2016. Some notable system wide changes include:

- GNOME Desktop 3.20
- GCC 6
- Python 3.5
- New system-wide font used by default

=== Fedora 25 ===
Fedora 25 was released on November 22, 2016. Some notable changes (see for more) are the use of the Wayland display system, Unicode 9, PHP 7.0, Node.js 6 and IBus Emoji typing.

=== Fedora 26 ===
Fedora 26 was released on July 11, 2017.

=== Fedora 27 ===
Fedora 27 was released on November 14, 2017.

The Workstation edition of Fedora 27 features GNOME 3.26. Both the Display and Network configuration panels have been updated, along with the overall Settings panel appearance improvement. The system search now shows more results at once, including the system actions. This release also features LibreOffice 5.4.

=== Fedora 28 ===
Fedora 28 was released on May 1, 2018. Red Hat Enterprise Linux 8 and other derivatives are based on Fedora 28.

Notable new features: a modular software repository and curated third-party software repositories.

=== Fedora 29 ===
Fedora 29 was released on October 30, 2018.

Notable new features: Fedora Modularity across all variants, a new optional package repository called Modular (also referred to as the "Application Stream" or AppStream), Gnome 3.30, ZRAM for ARM images, Fedora Scientific Vagrant images

=== Fedora 30 ===
Fedora 30 was released on April 30, 2019. Its change set is here.

=== Fedora 31 ===
Fedora 31 was released October 29, 2019. Its change set is here.

=== Fedora 32 ===
Fedora 32 was released April 28, 2020. Its change set is here.

=== Fedora 33 ===
Fedora 33 was released on October 27, 2020. Its change set is here.

Fedora 33 Workstation Edition was the first version of the operating system to default to using Btrfs as its default file system, and replacement of a swap partition with zram. It featured version 3.38 of the GNOME desktop environment, and Linux kernel 5.8.15. For the first time since version 7, Fedora defaulted to a slideshow background (four png images of the Earth, from space) that changes hue according to the time of day. GNU nano became the default text editor for the command-line interface in place of vi. Fedora IoT, while previously available as a "Fedora Spin", was promoted to an official edition of the operating system.

=== Fedora 34 ===
Fedora 34 was released April 27, 2021. Its change set is here.

Red Hat Enterprise Linux 9 and other derivatives are based on Fedora 34. Its change set includes GNOME 40, filesystem compression by default, exclusive use of Pipewire, and defaulting KDE Plasma to Wayland.

=== Fedora 35 ===
Fedora 35 was released on November 2, 2021. Its change set is here.

=== Fedora 36 ===
Fedora 36 was released on May 10, 2022. Its change set is here.

=== Fedora 37 ===
Fedora 37 was released on November 15, 2022. Its change set is here.

=== Fedora 38 ===
Fedora 38 was released on April 18, 2023. Its change set is here.

=== Fedora 39 ===
Fedora 39 was released on November 7, 2023. Its change set is here.

=== Fedora 40 ===
Fedora 40 was released on April 23, 2024. Its change set is here.

=== Fedora 41 ===
Fedora 41 was released on October 29, 2024. Its change set is here.

=== Fedora 42 ===
Fedora 42, codenamed Adams (as a one-off), was released on April 15, 2025. Its change set is here.

This version saw the KDE Plasma Spin promoted to an edition on the same level as Fedora Workstation with GNOME (which is now at version 48).

=== Fedora 43 ===
Fedora 43 was released on October 28, 2025. Its change set is here.

=== Fedora 44 ===
Fedora 44 was released on April 28, 2026. Its change set is here.

Fedora 44 supports python 3.14.4, C++ 26, and C 23.

=== Fedora 45 ===
Fedora 45 was released on November 4, 2026.

«We have a lot of excellent content under the hood in this release. Below is only a snapshot of them. Take a spin through our release notes for individual changes, and details on each change.» Fedora Project, 2026.

== Images gallery ==
Fedora Linux default UI screenshots

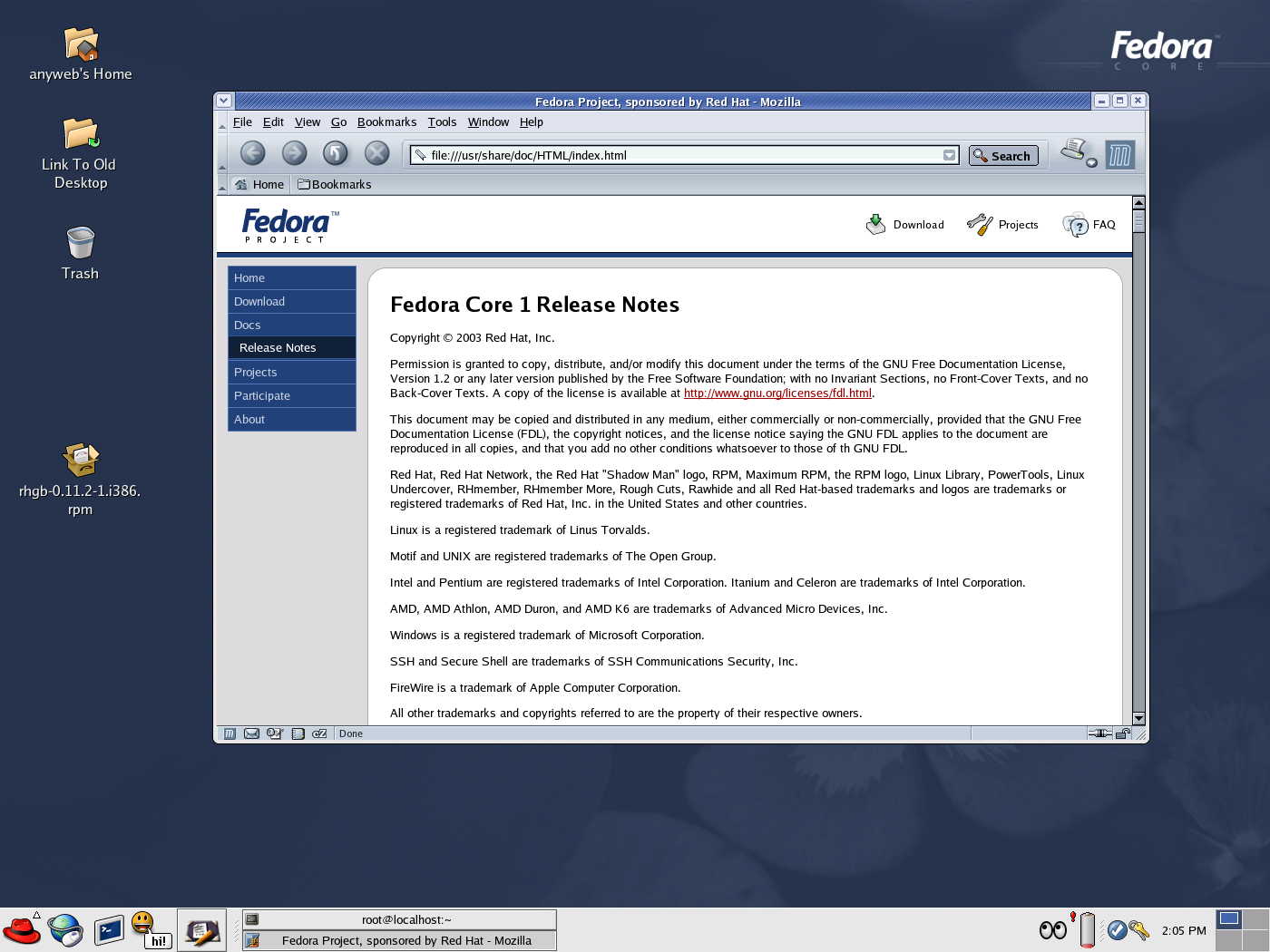
Fedora Core 1

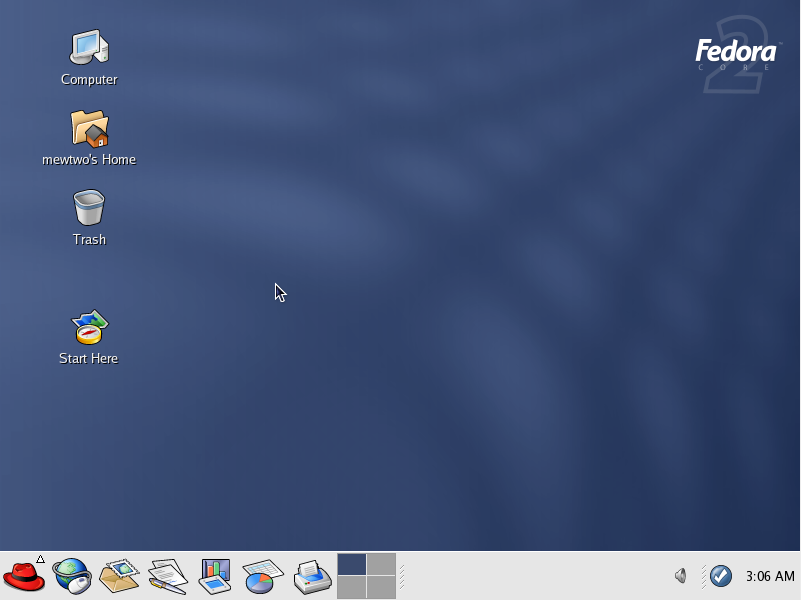
Fedora Core 2

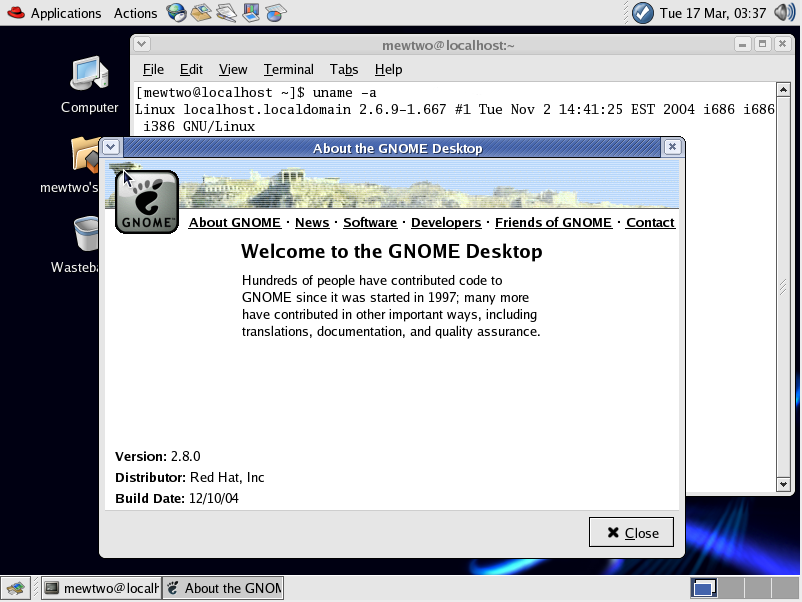
Fedora Core 3

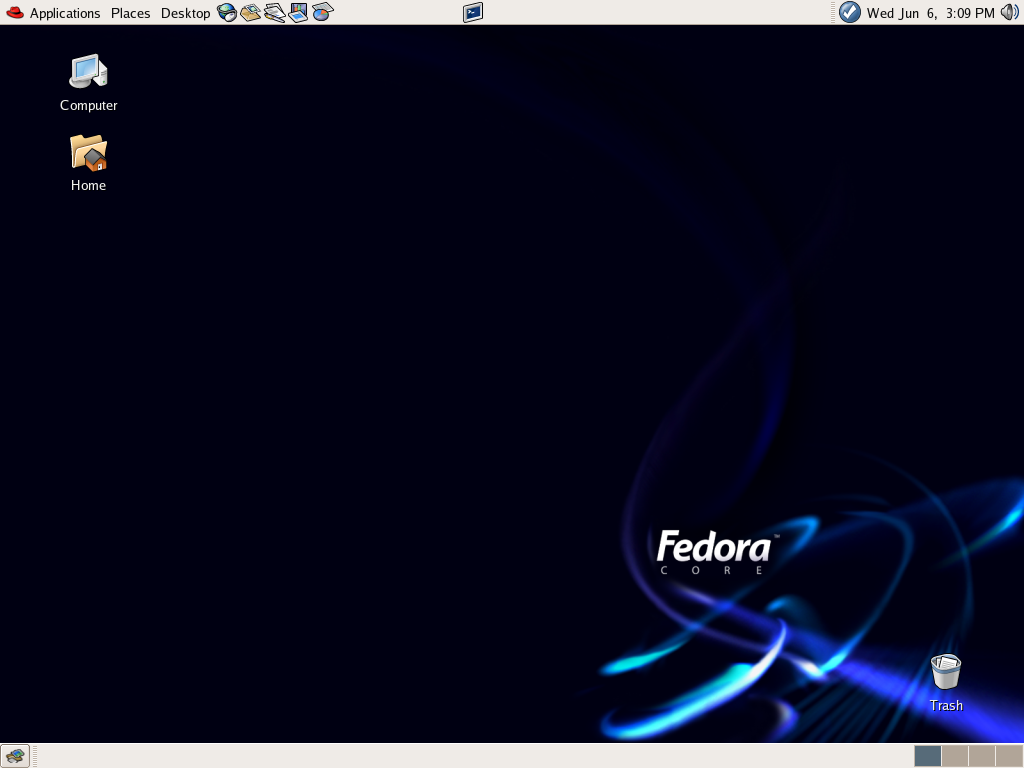
Fedora Core 4

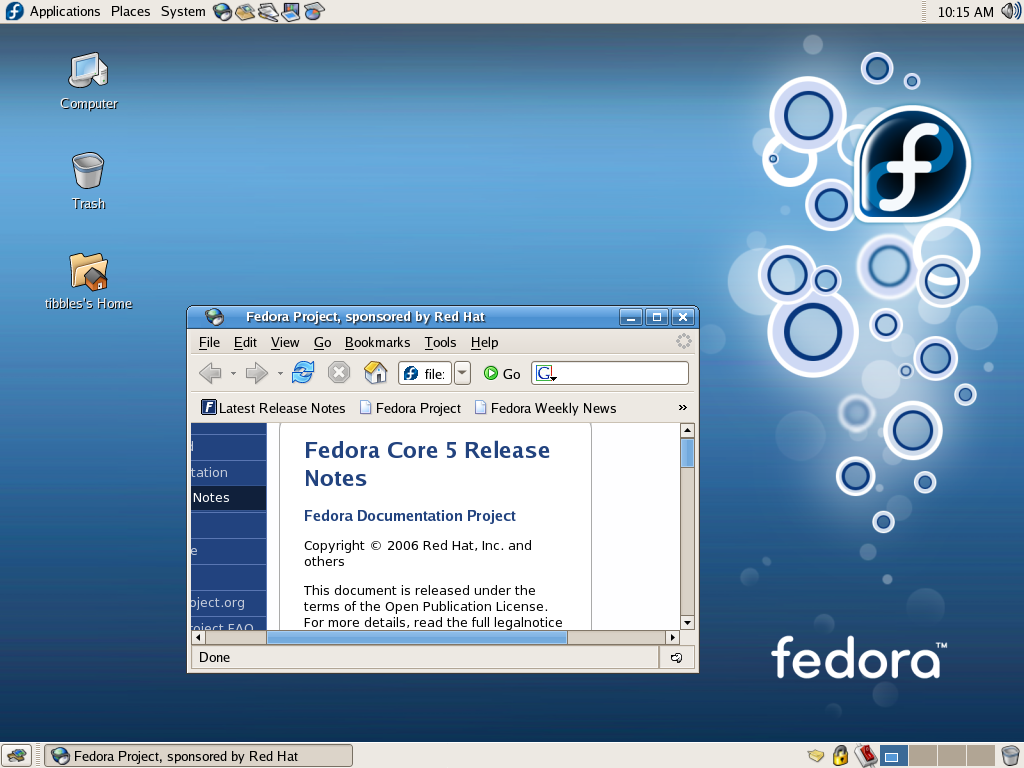
Fedora Core 5

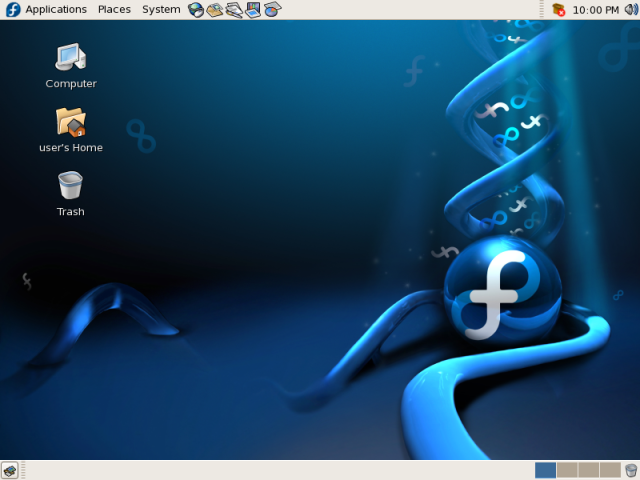
Fedora Core 6

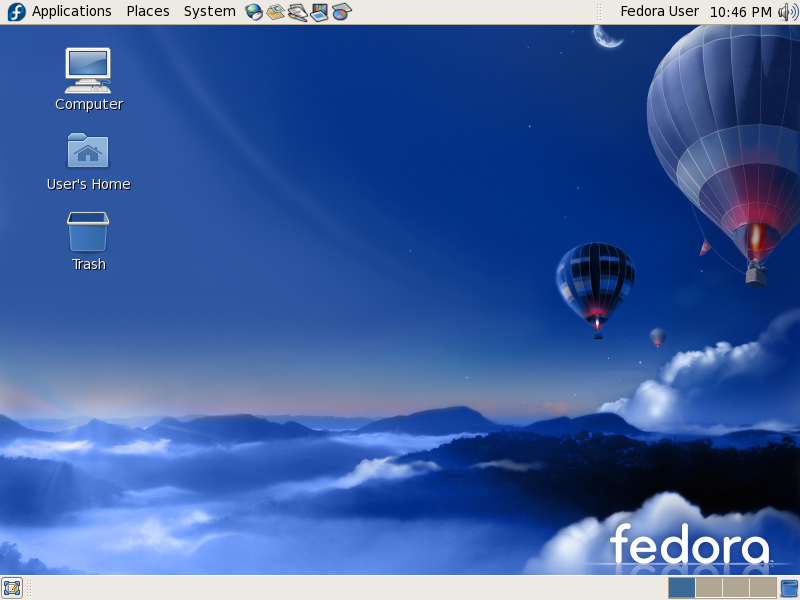
Fedora Core 7

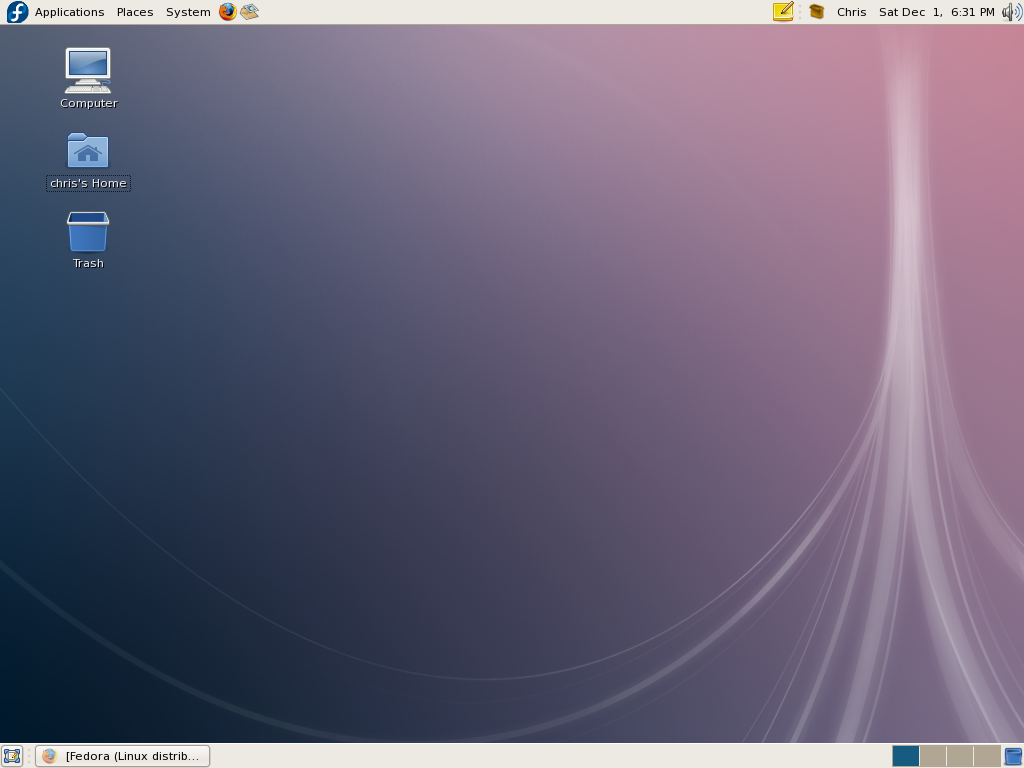
Fedora 8

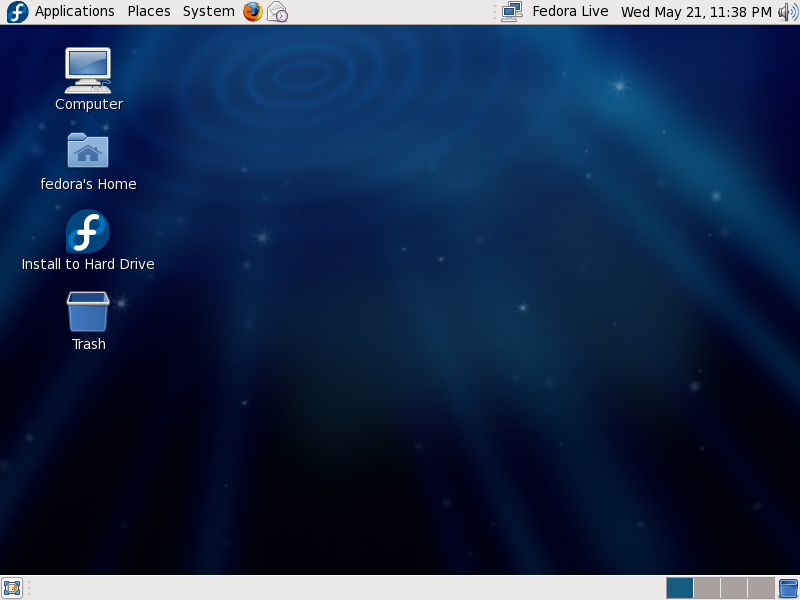
Fedora 9

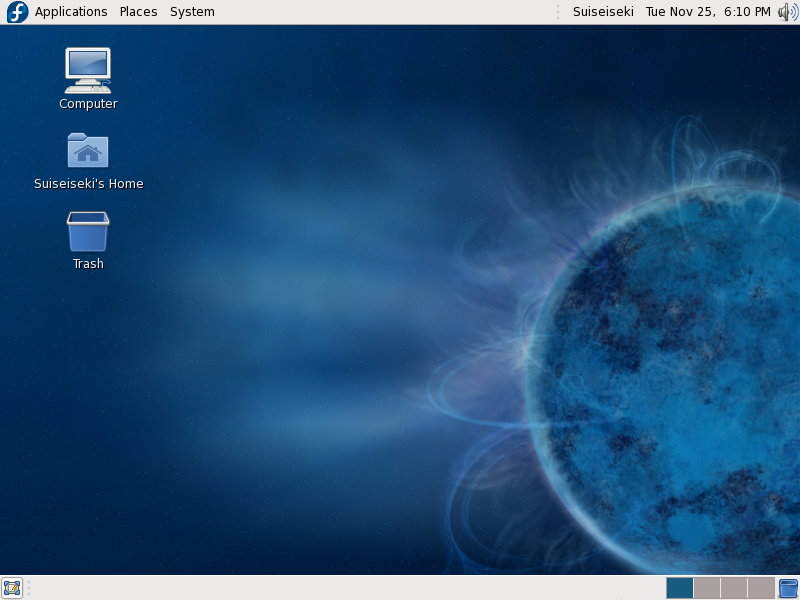
Fedora 10

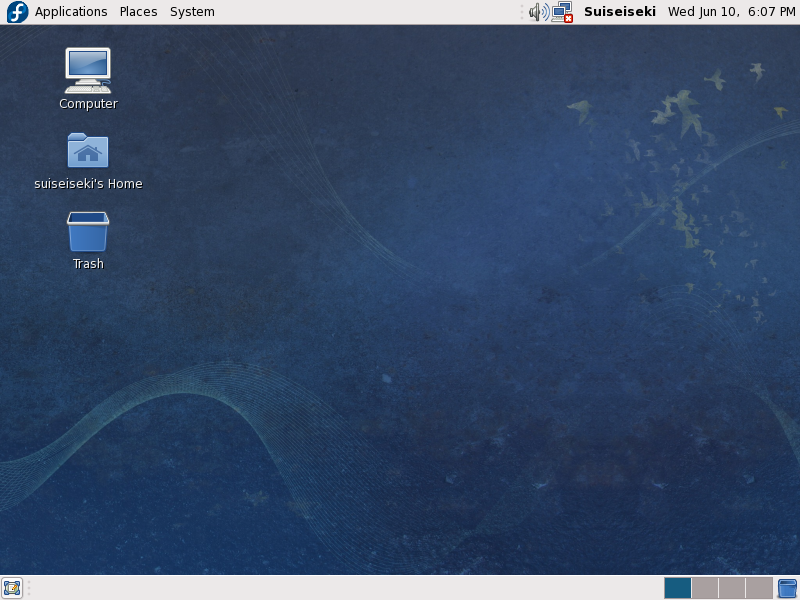
Fedora 11

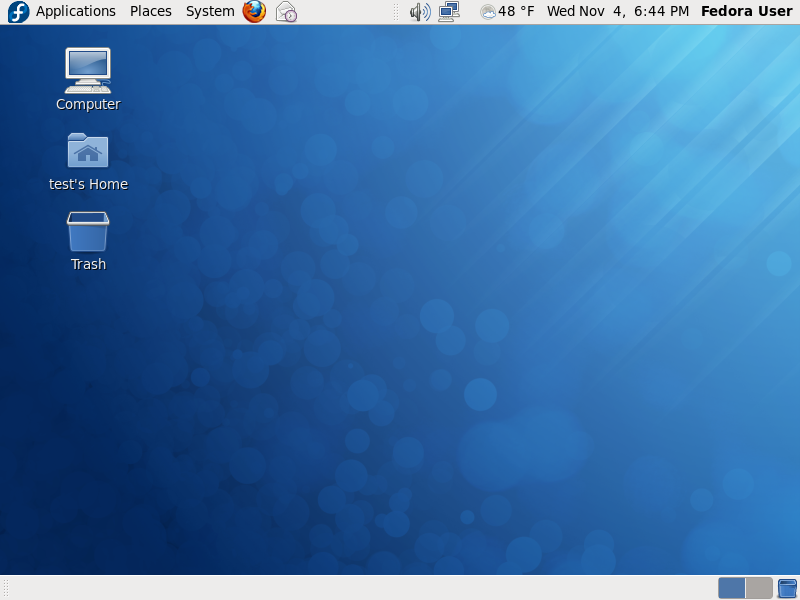
Fedora 12

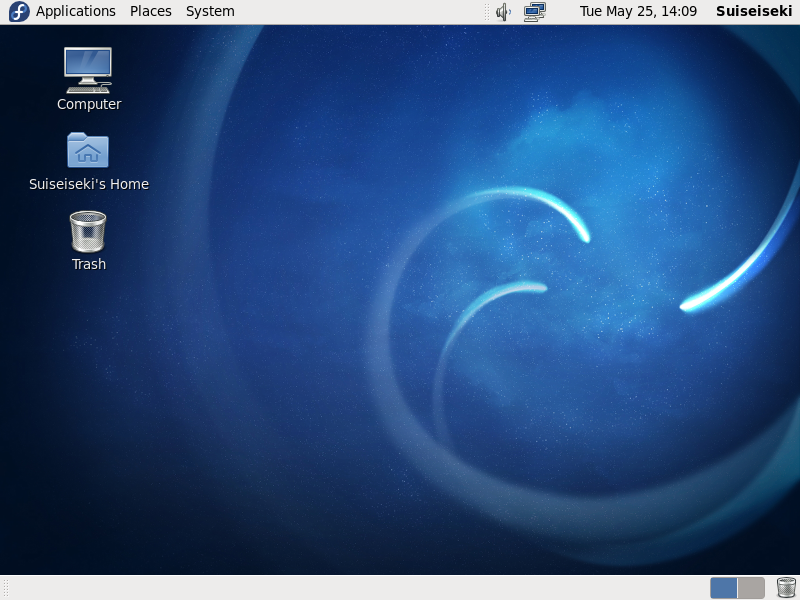
Fedora 13

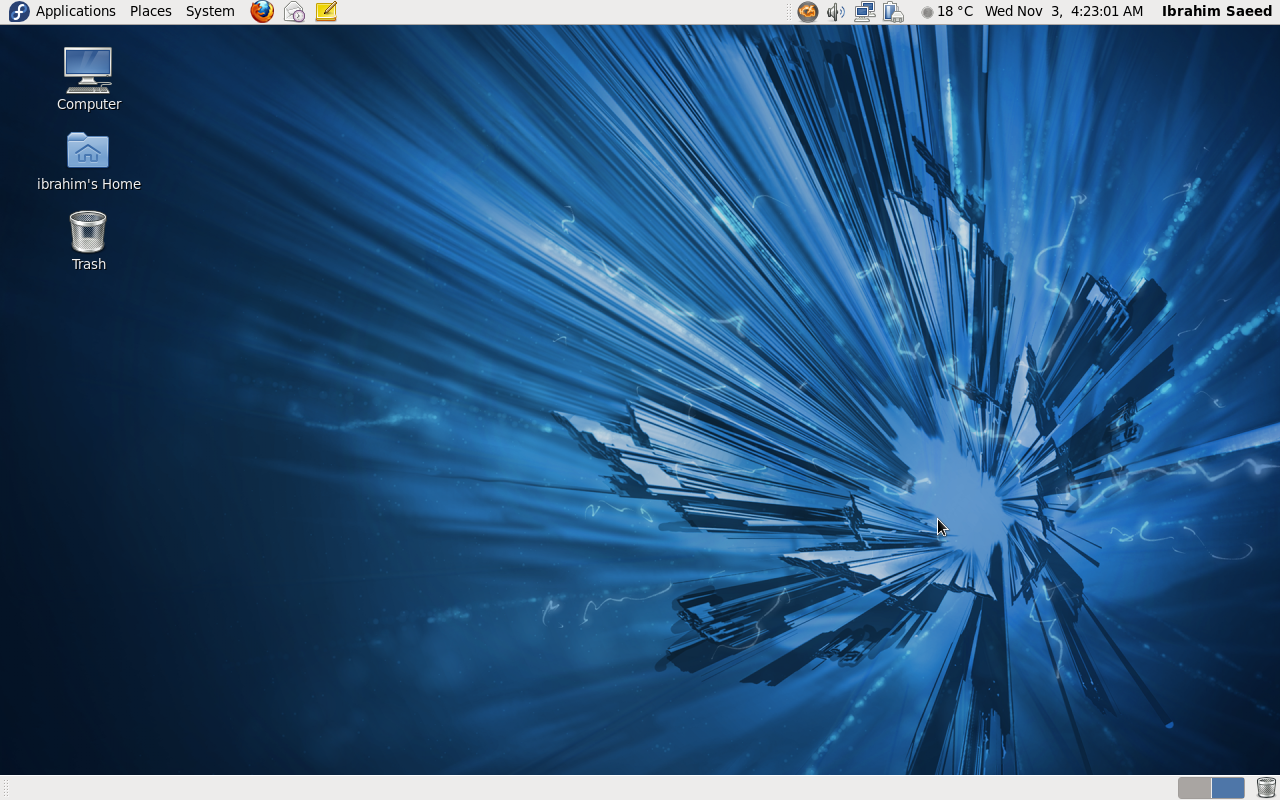
Fedora 14

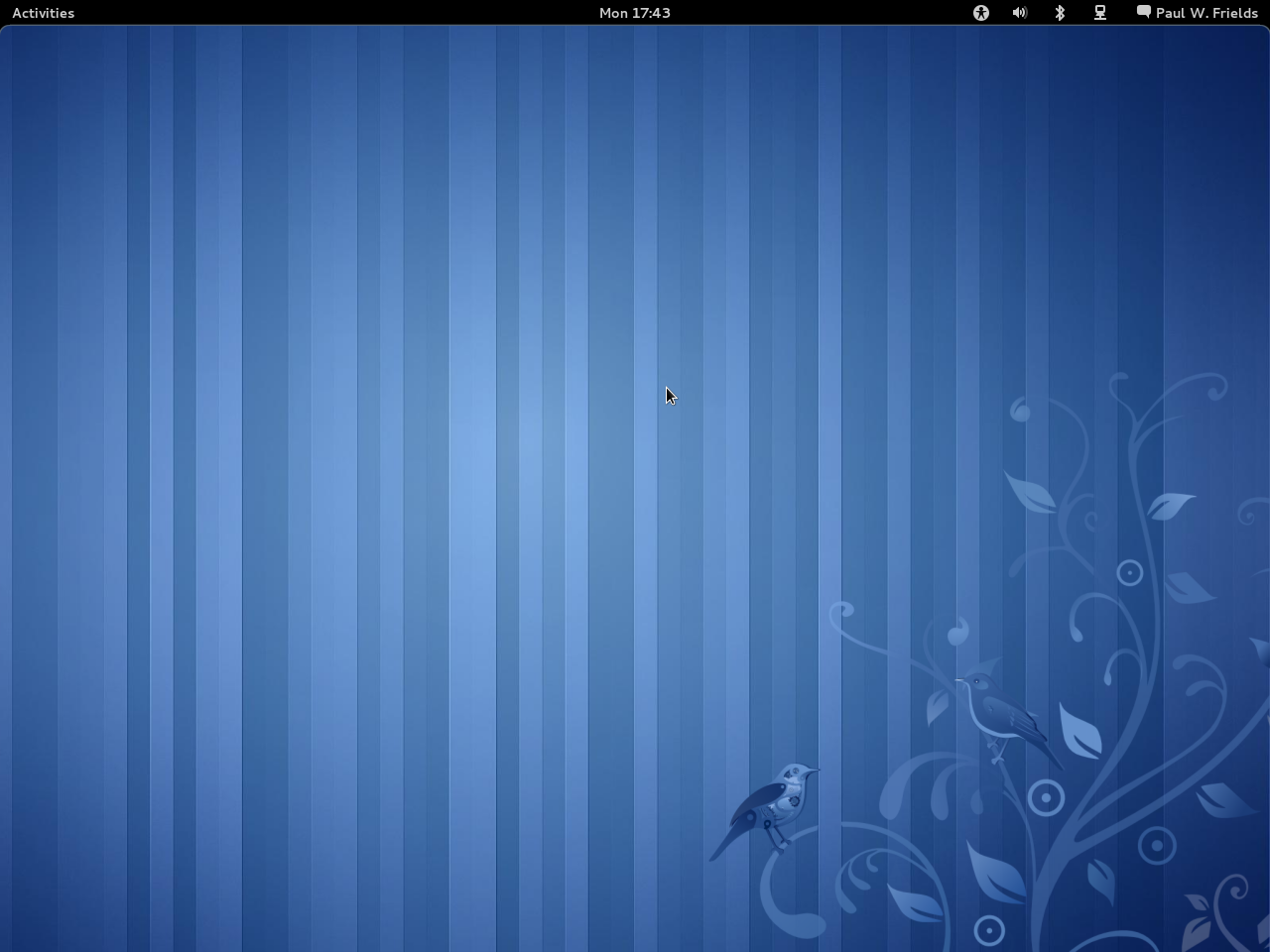
Fedora 15

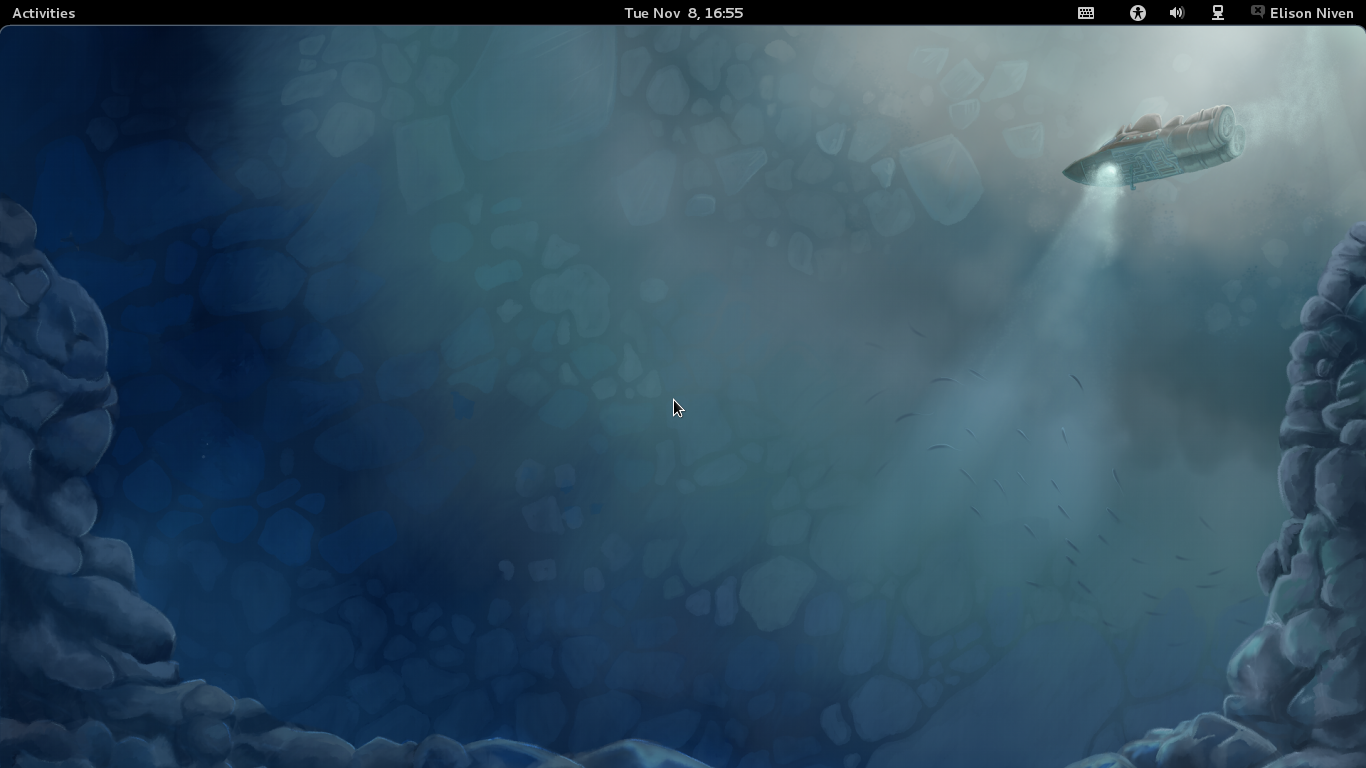
Fedora 16

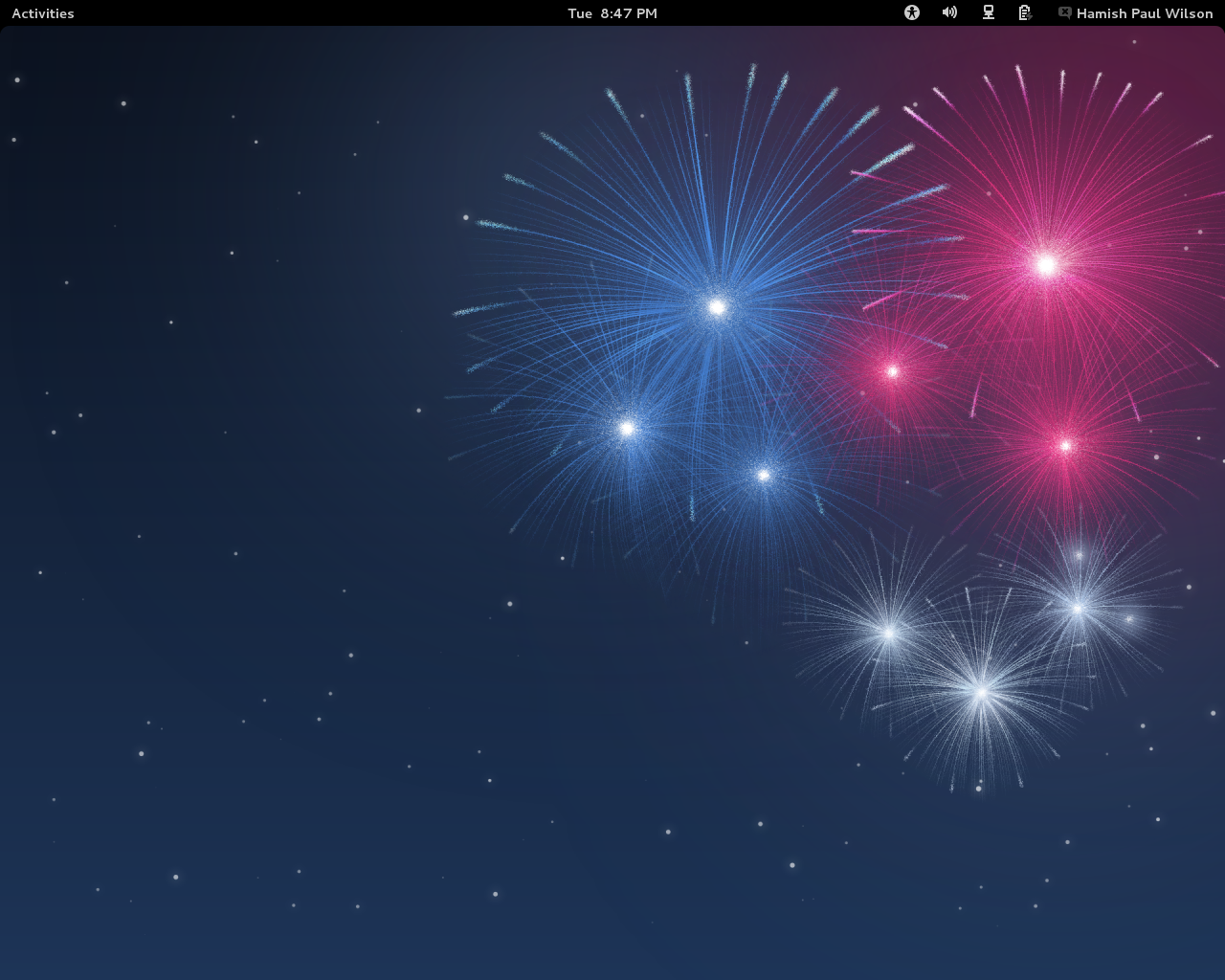
Fedora 17

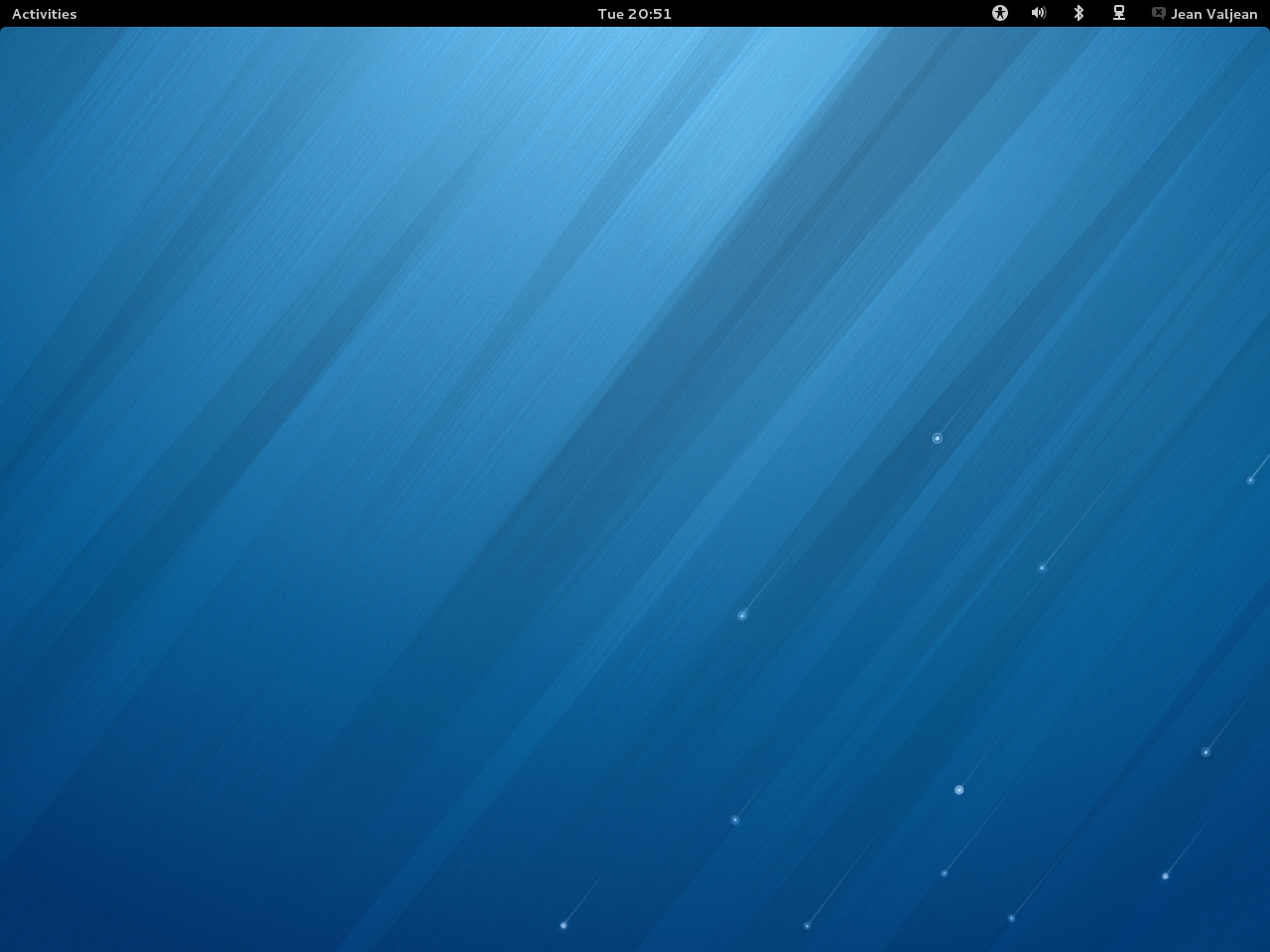
Fedora 18

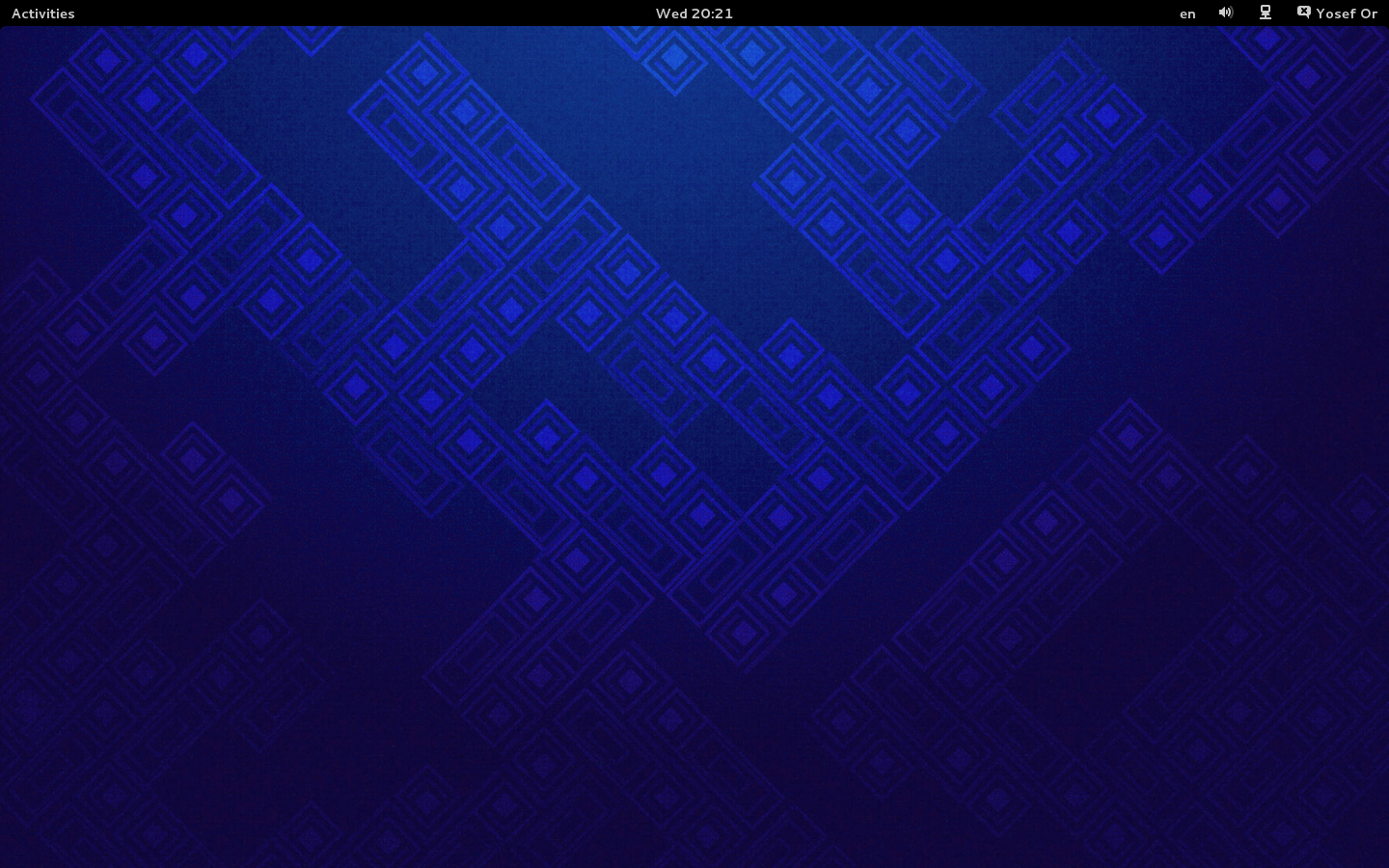
Fedora 19

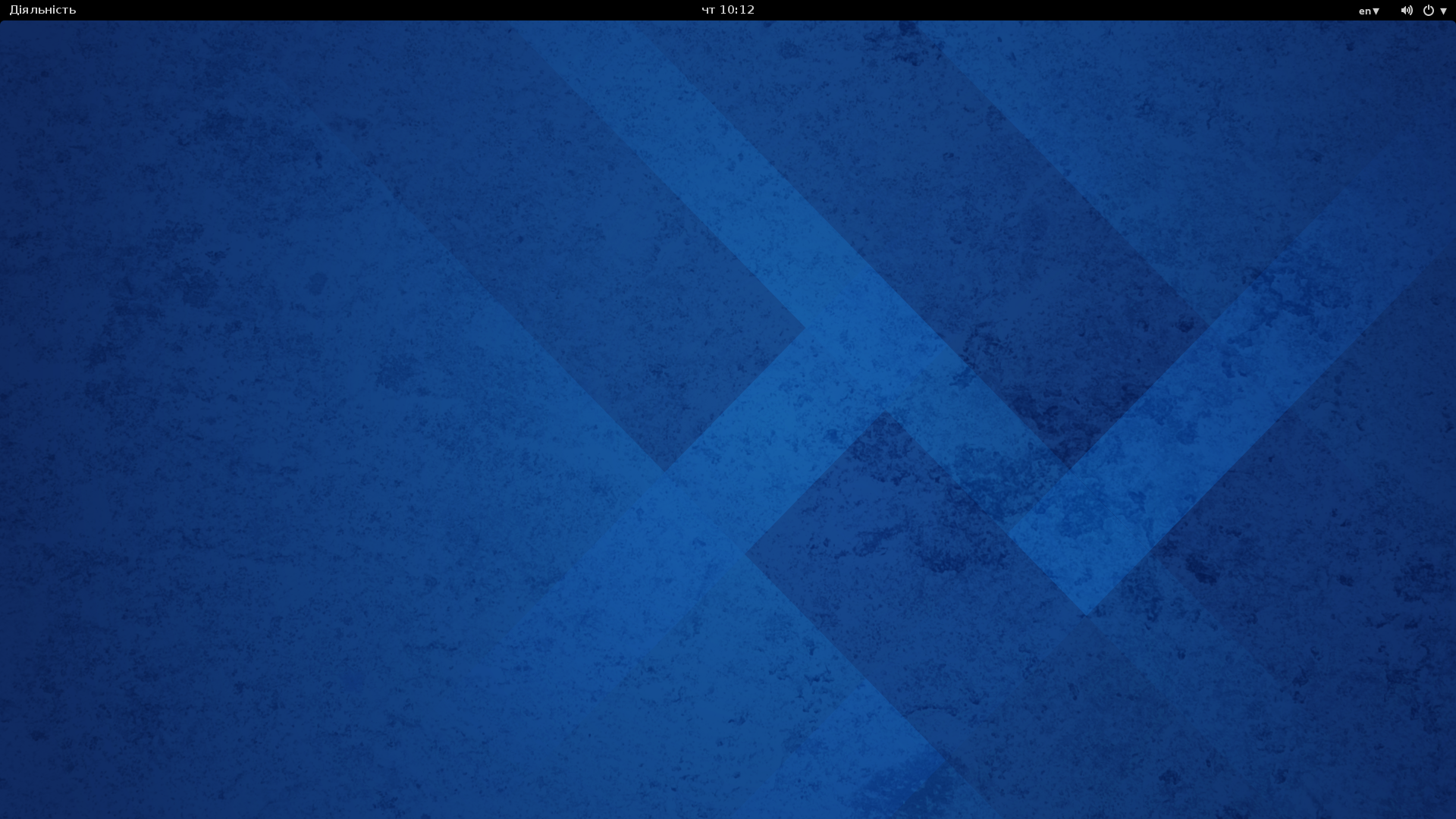
Fedora 20

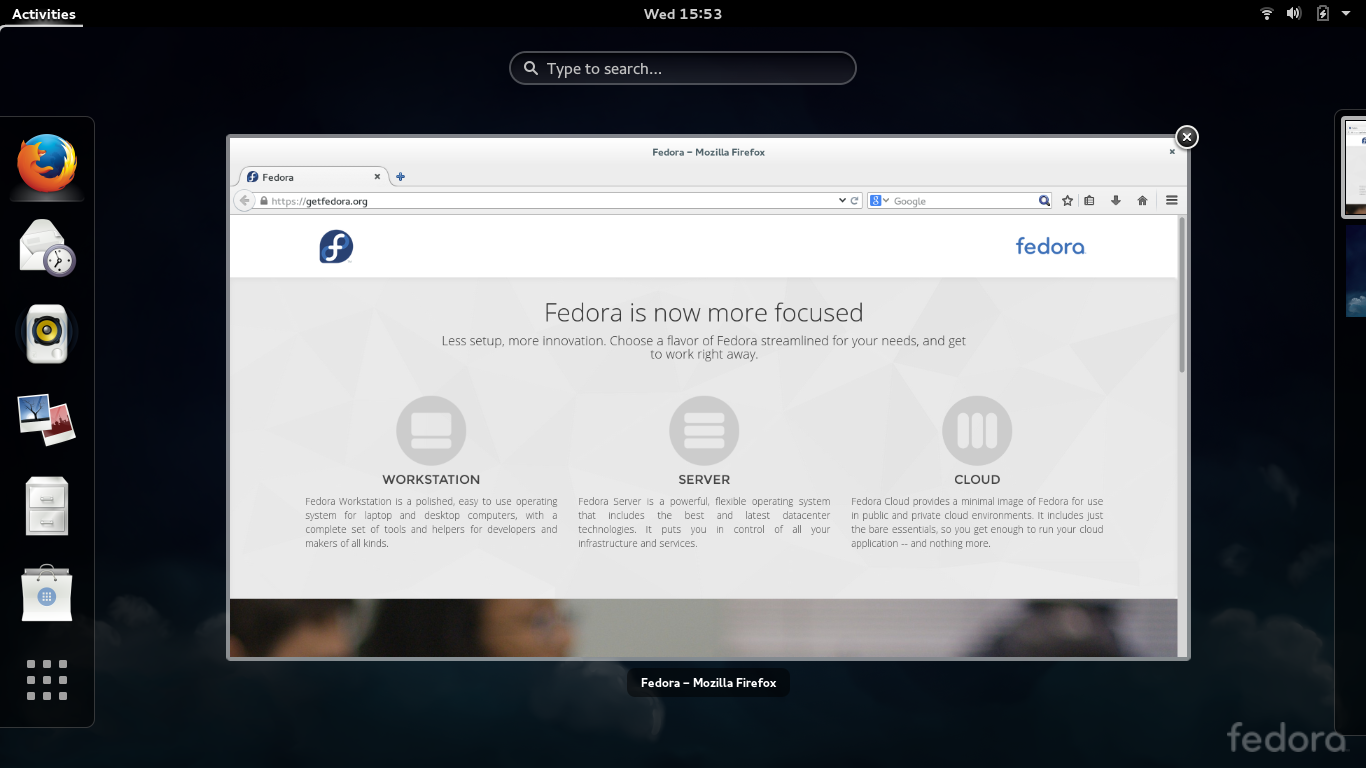
Fedora 21

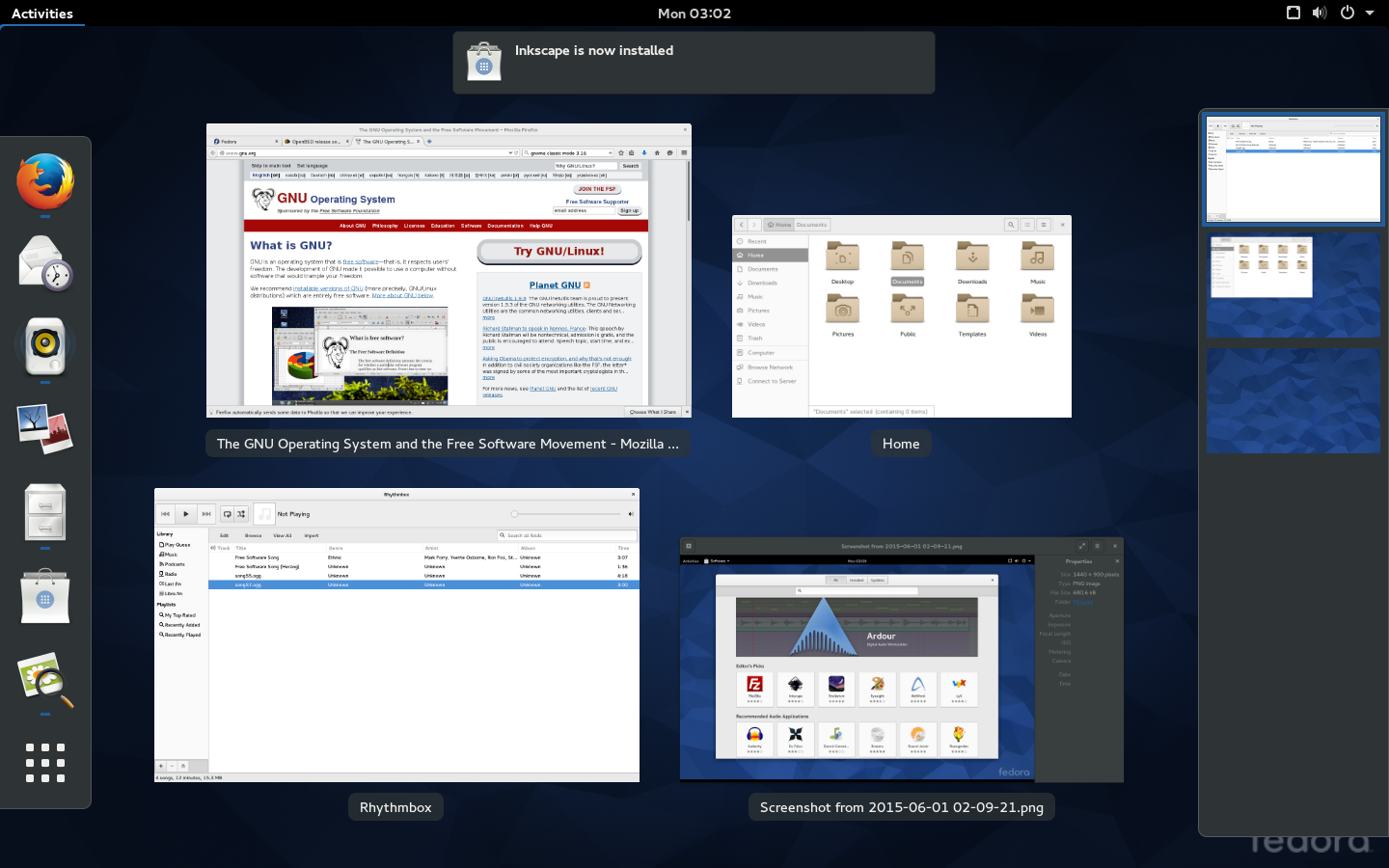
Fedora 22

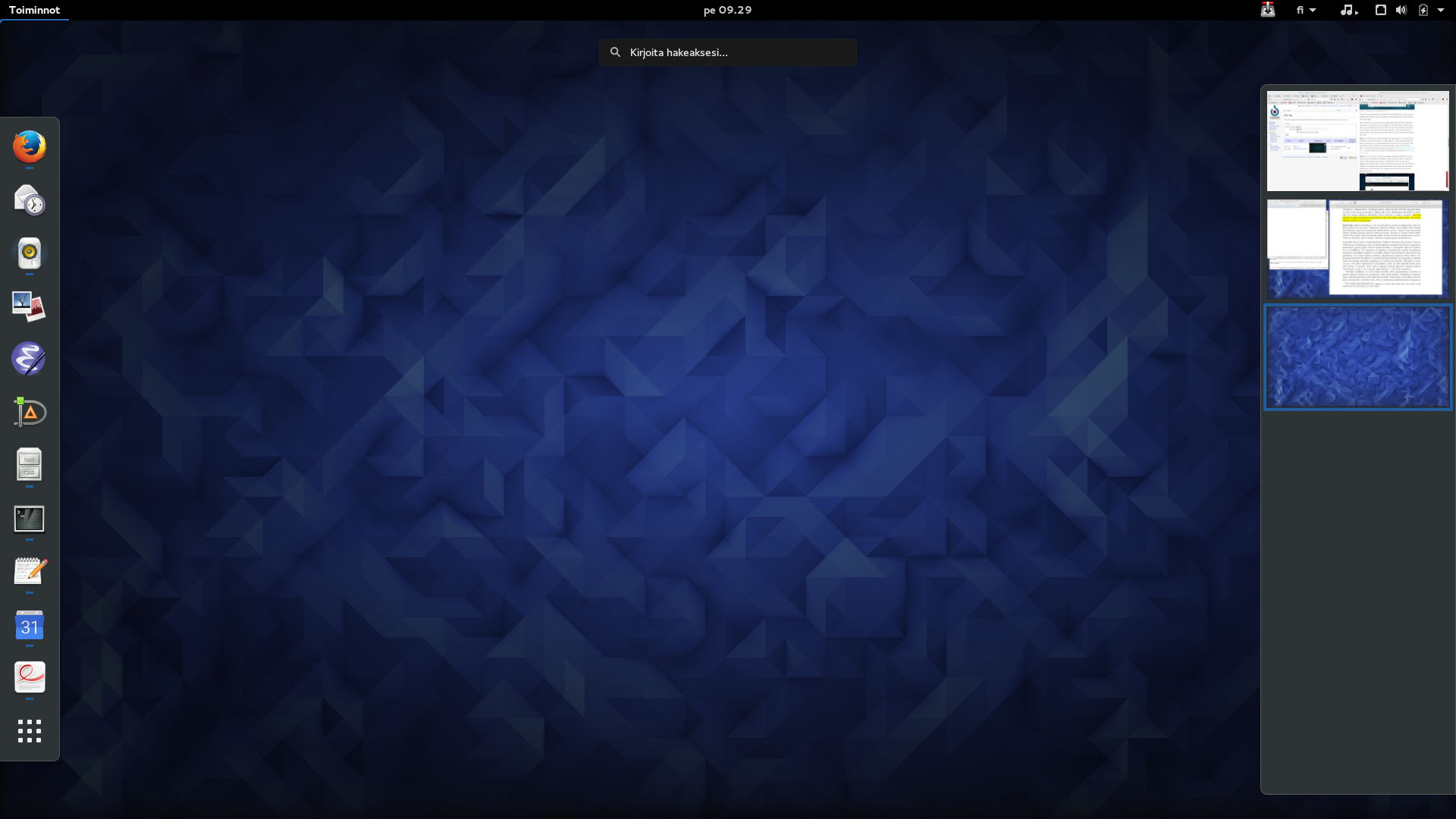
Fedora 23

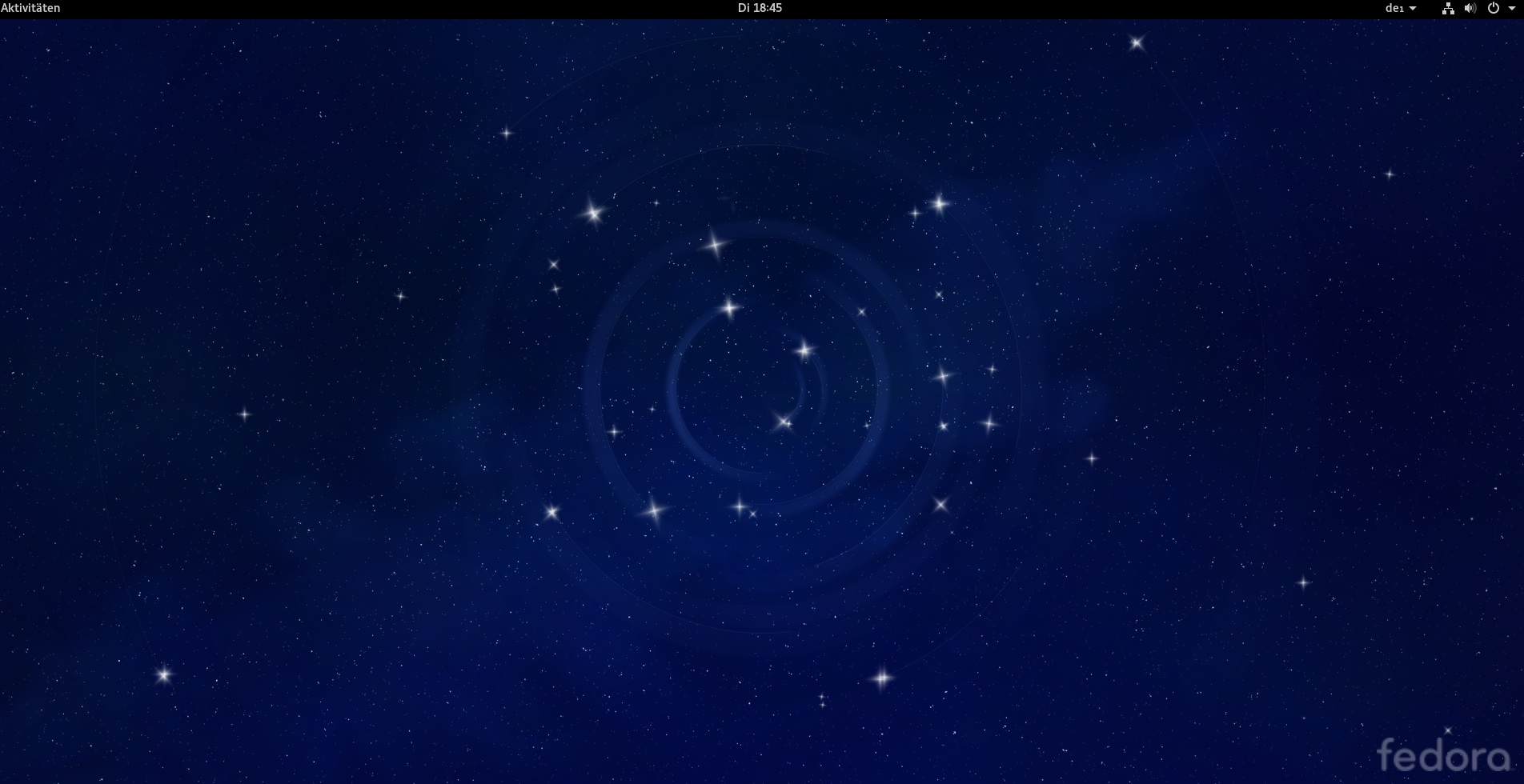
Fedora 24

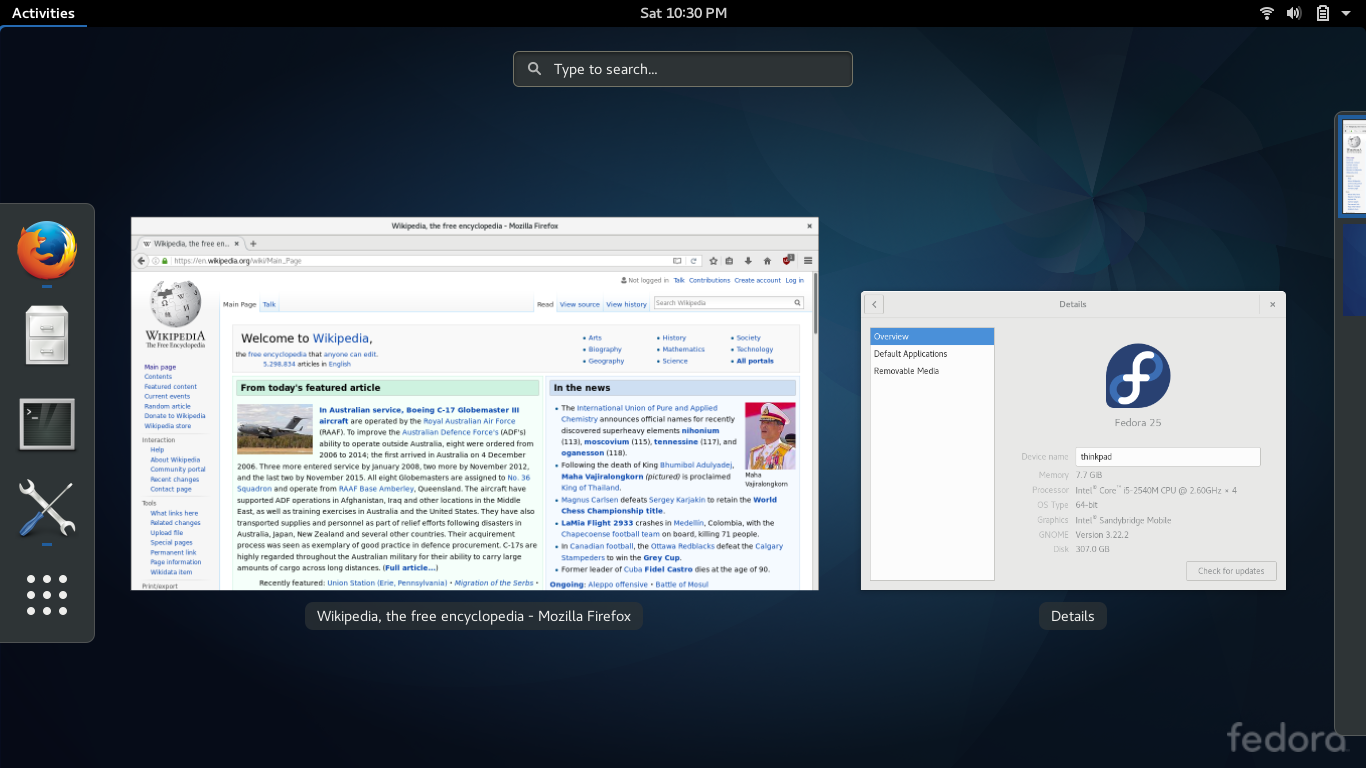
Fedora 25

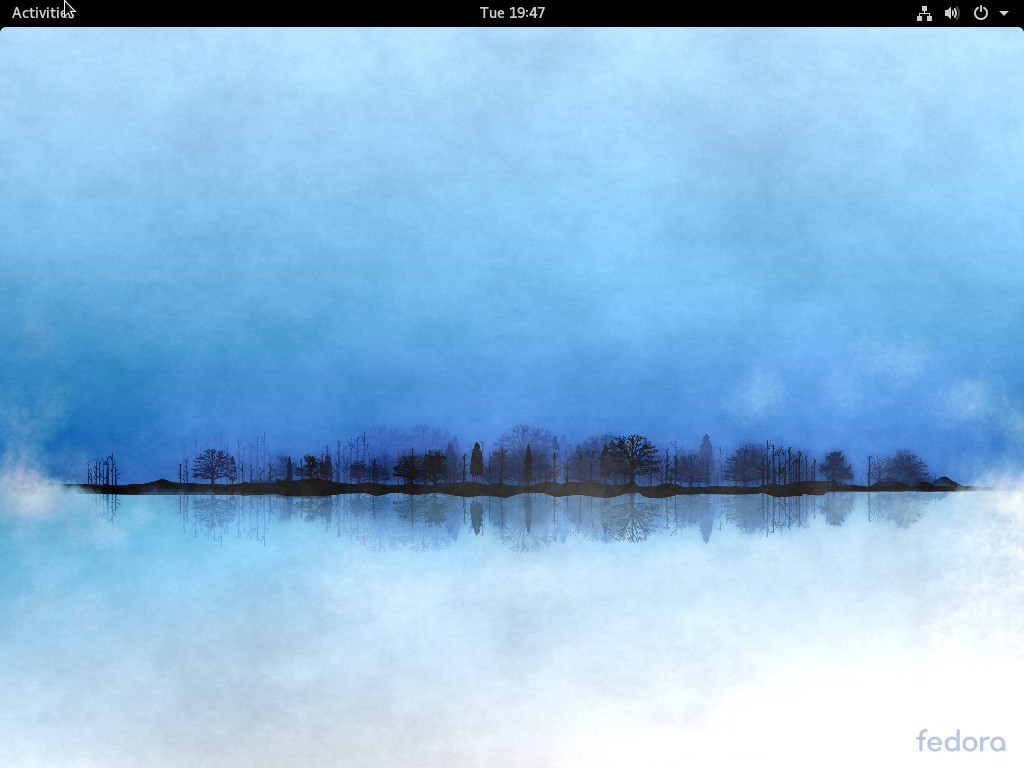
Fedora 26

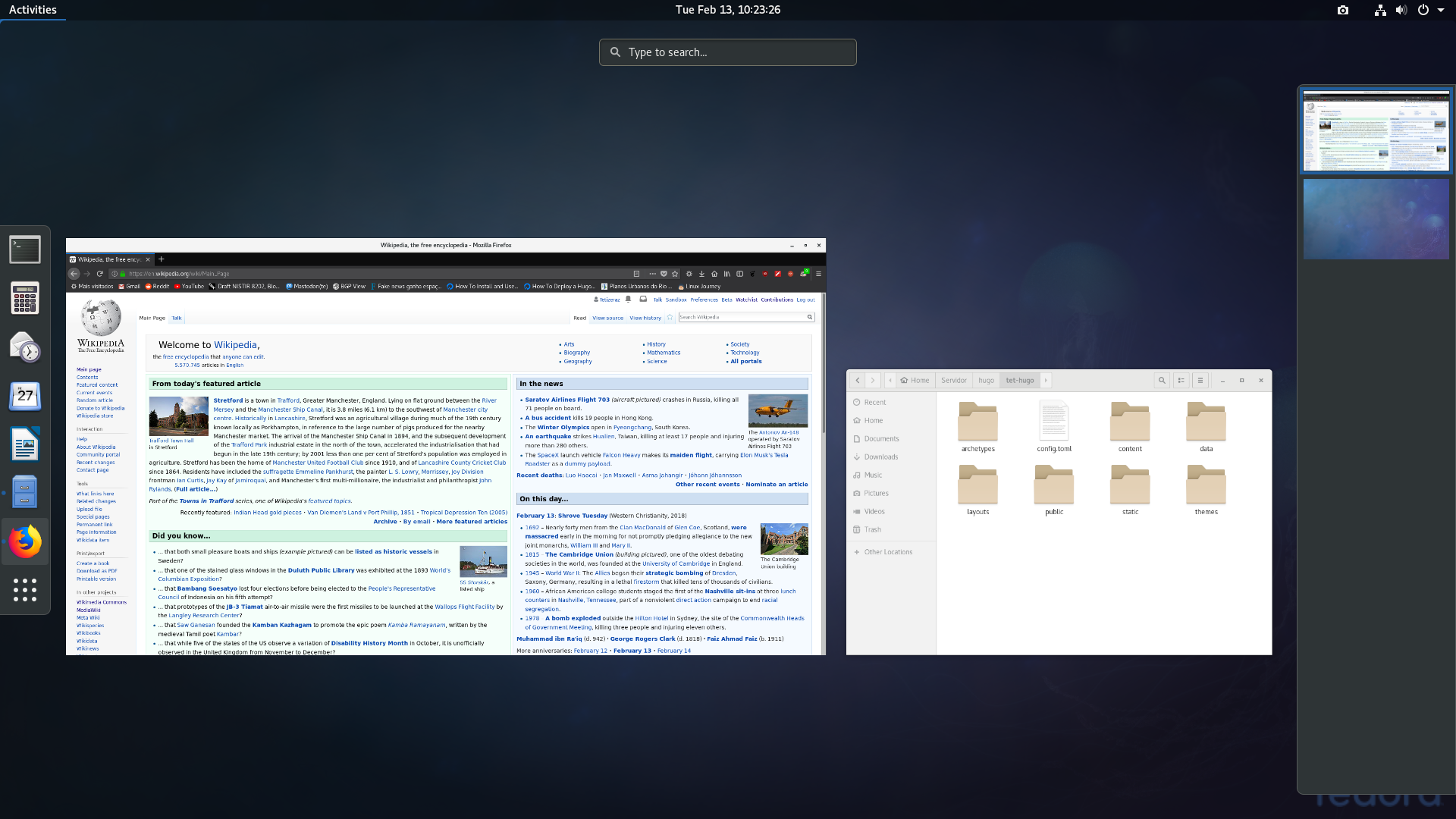
Fedora 27

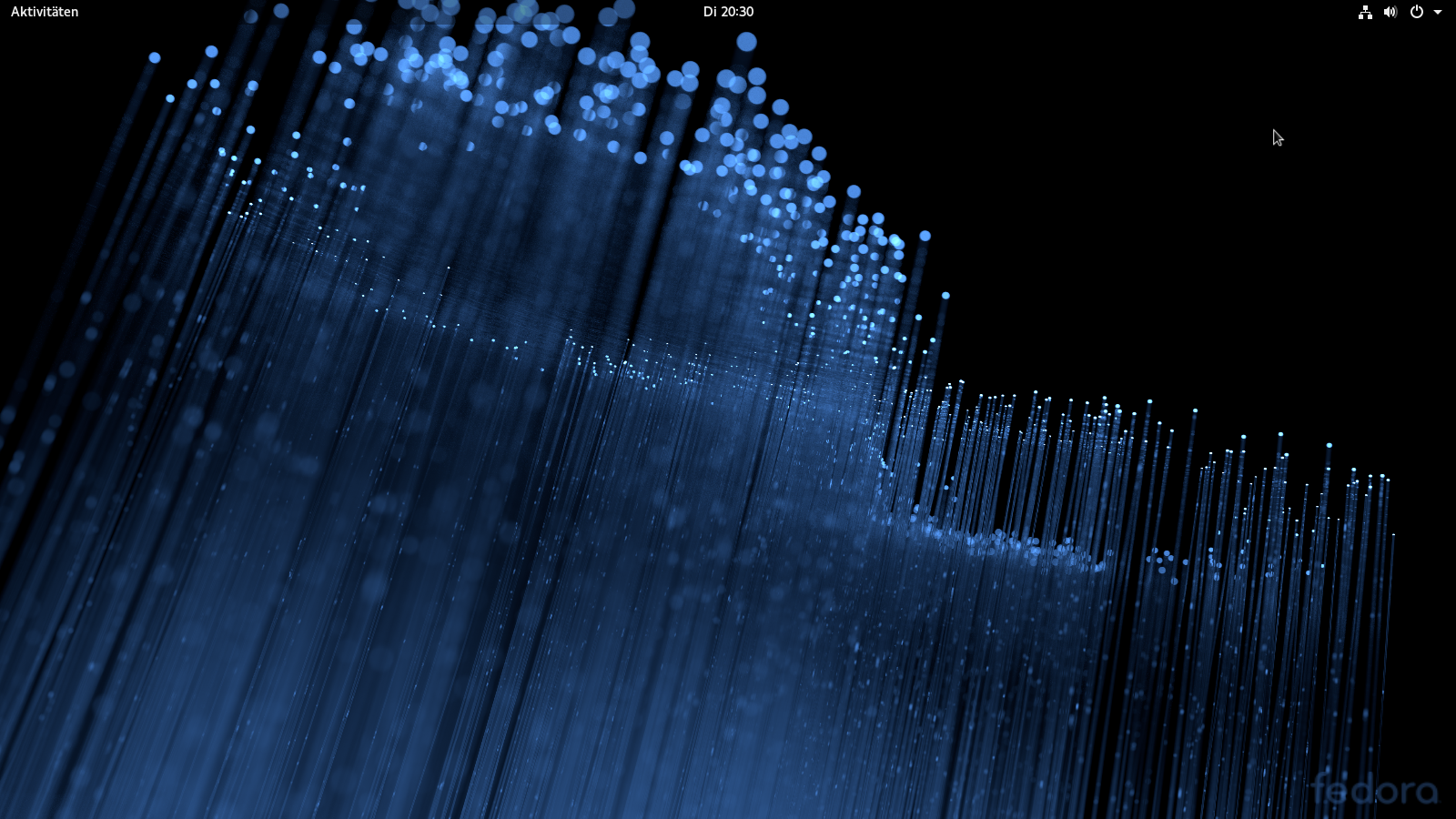
Fedora 28

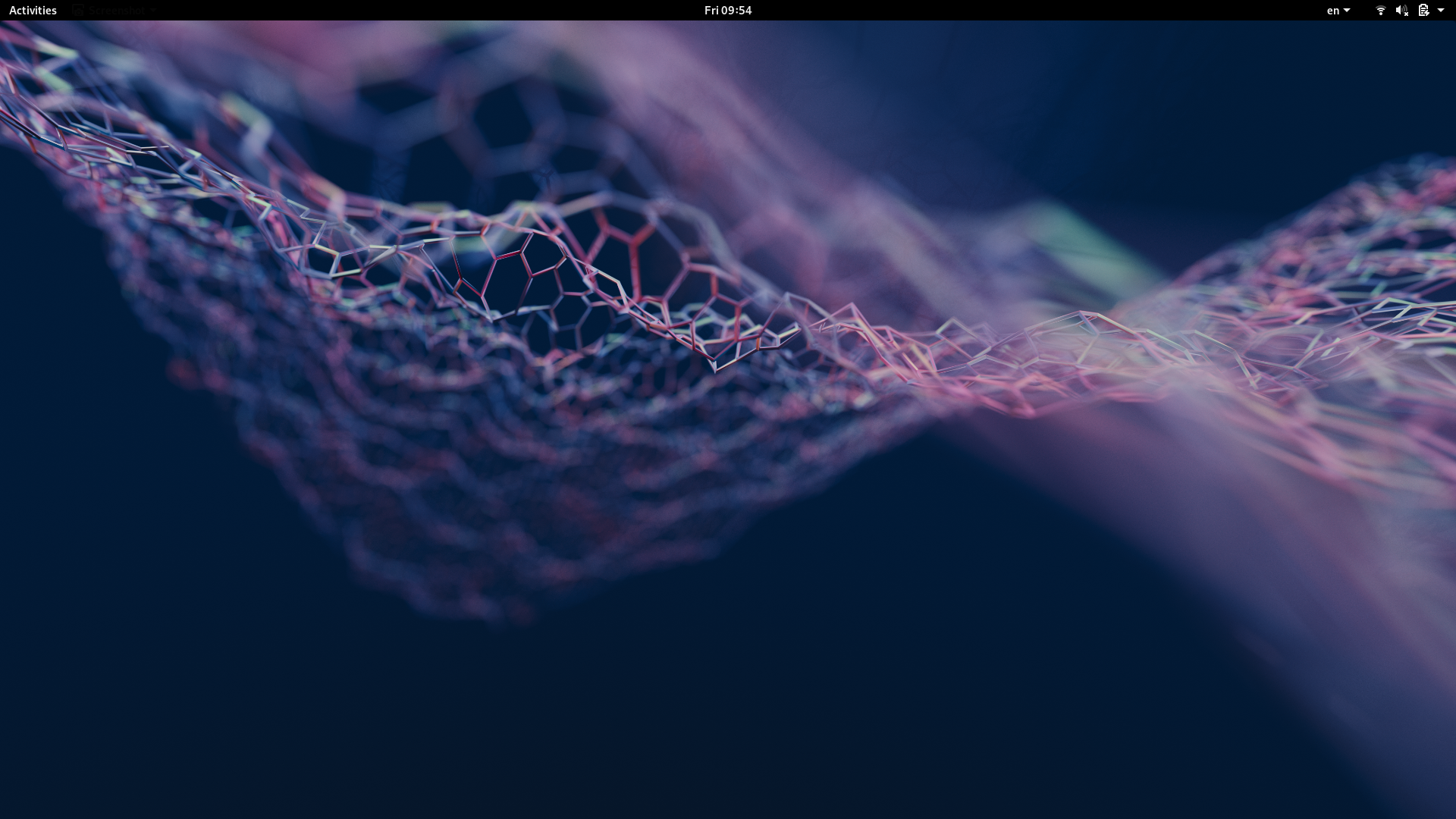
Fedora 29

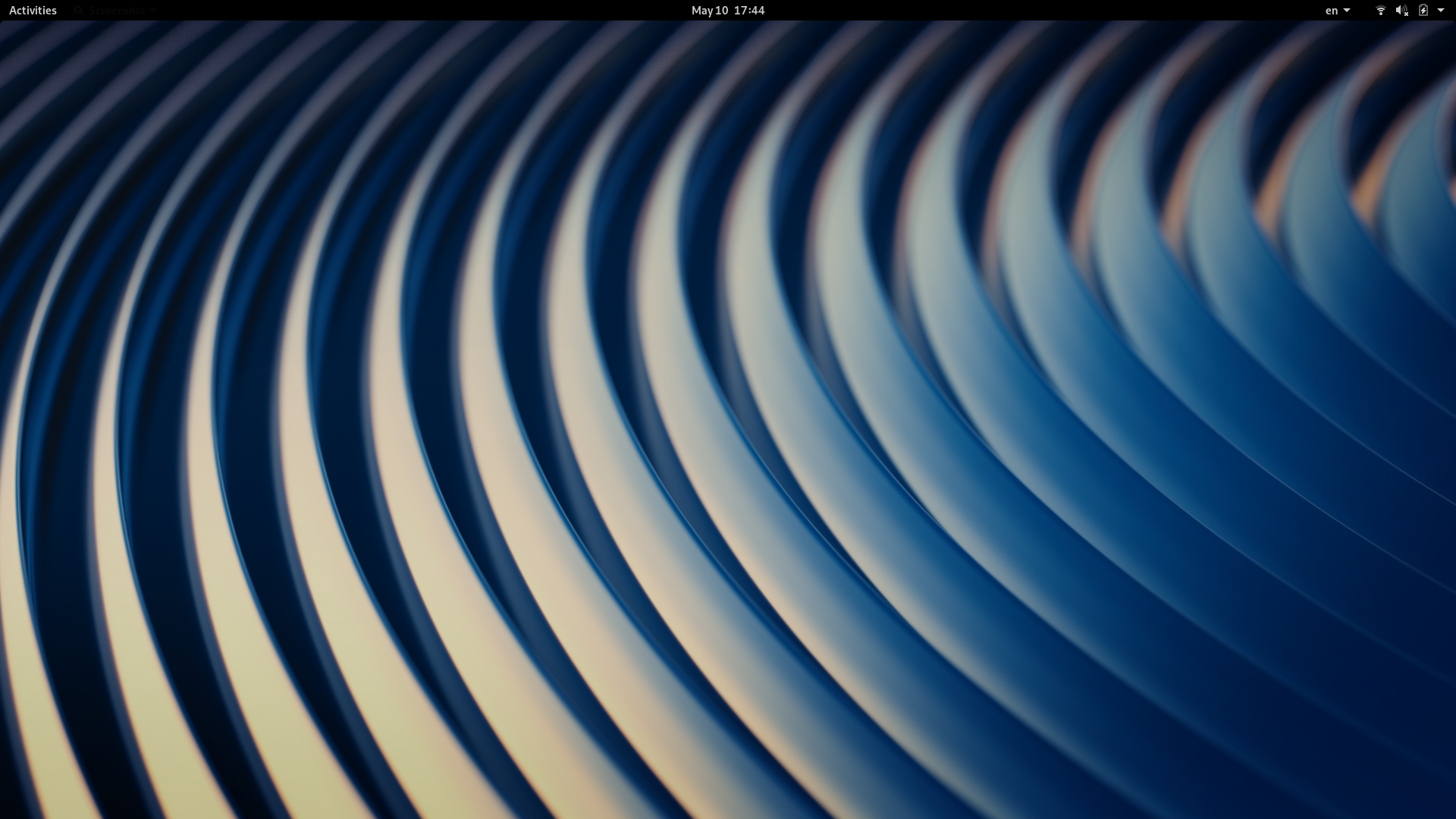
Fedora 30

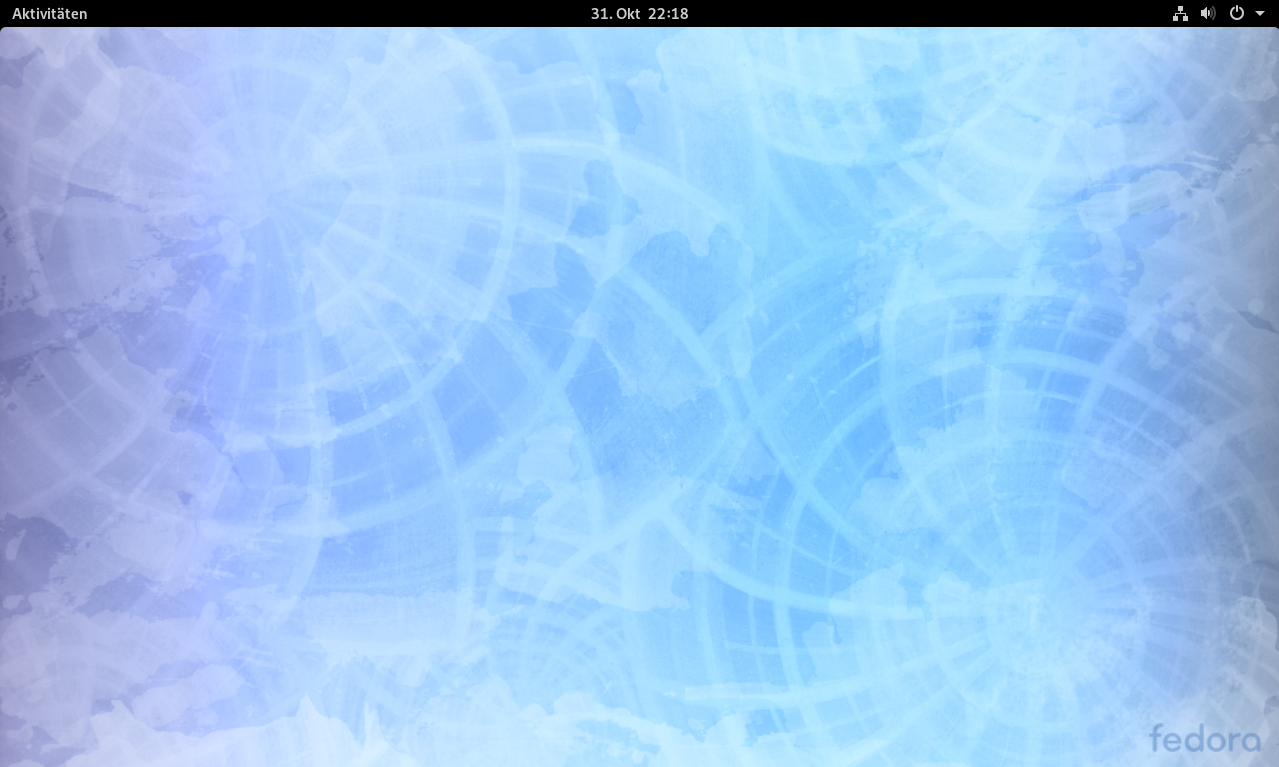
Fedora 31

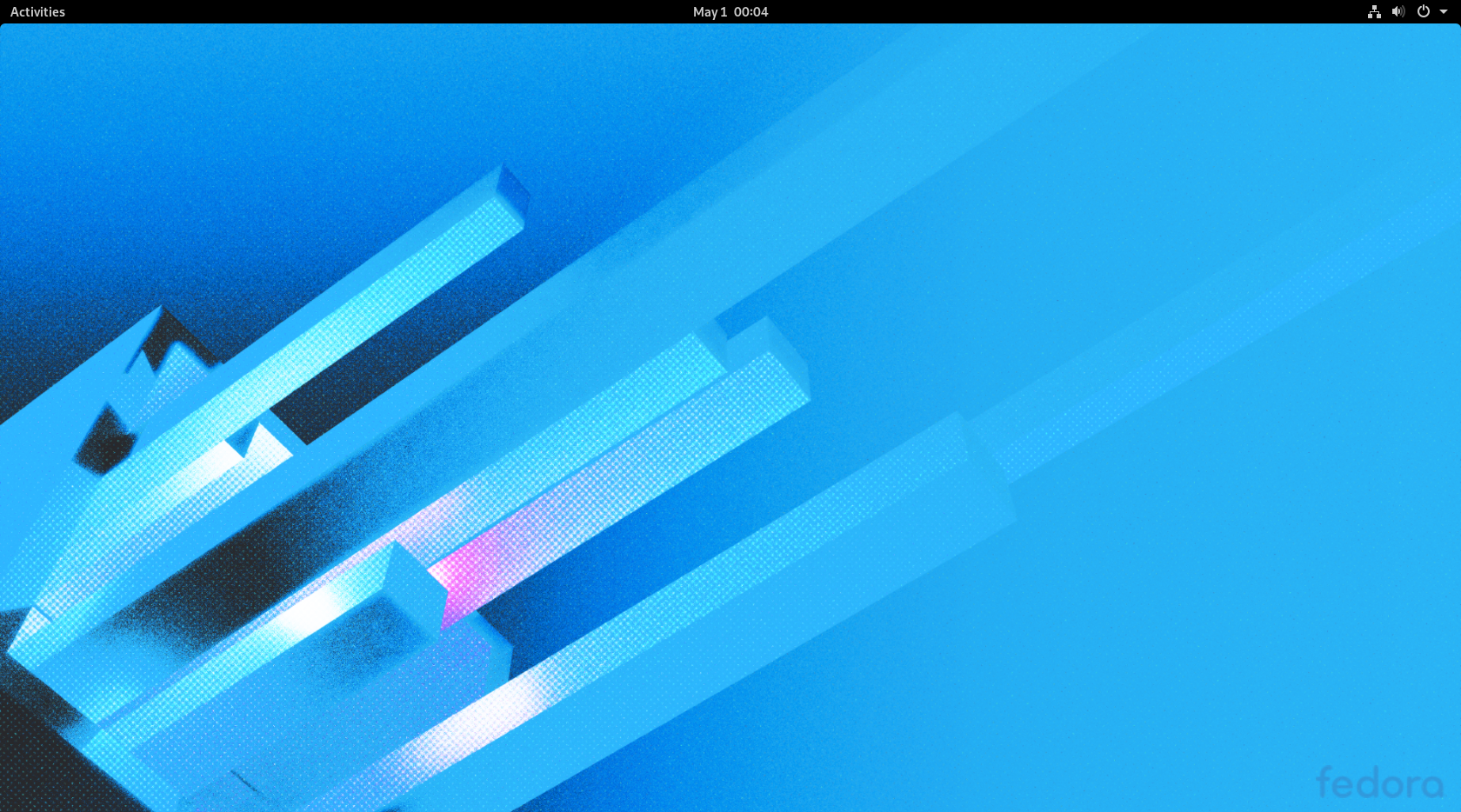
Fedora 32

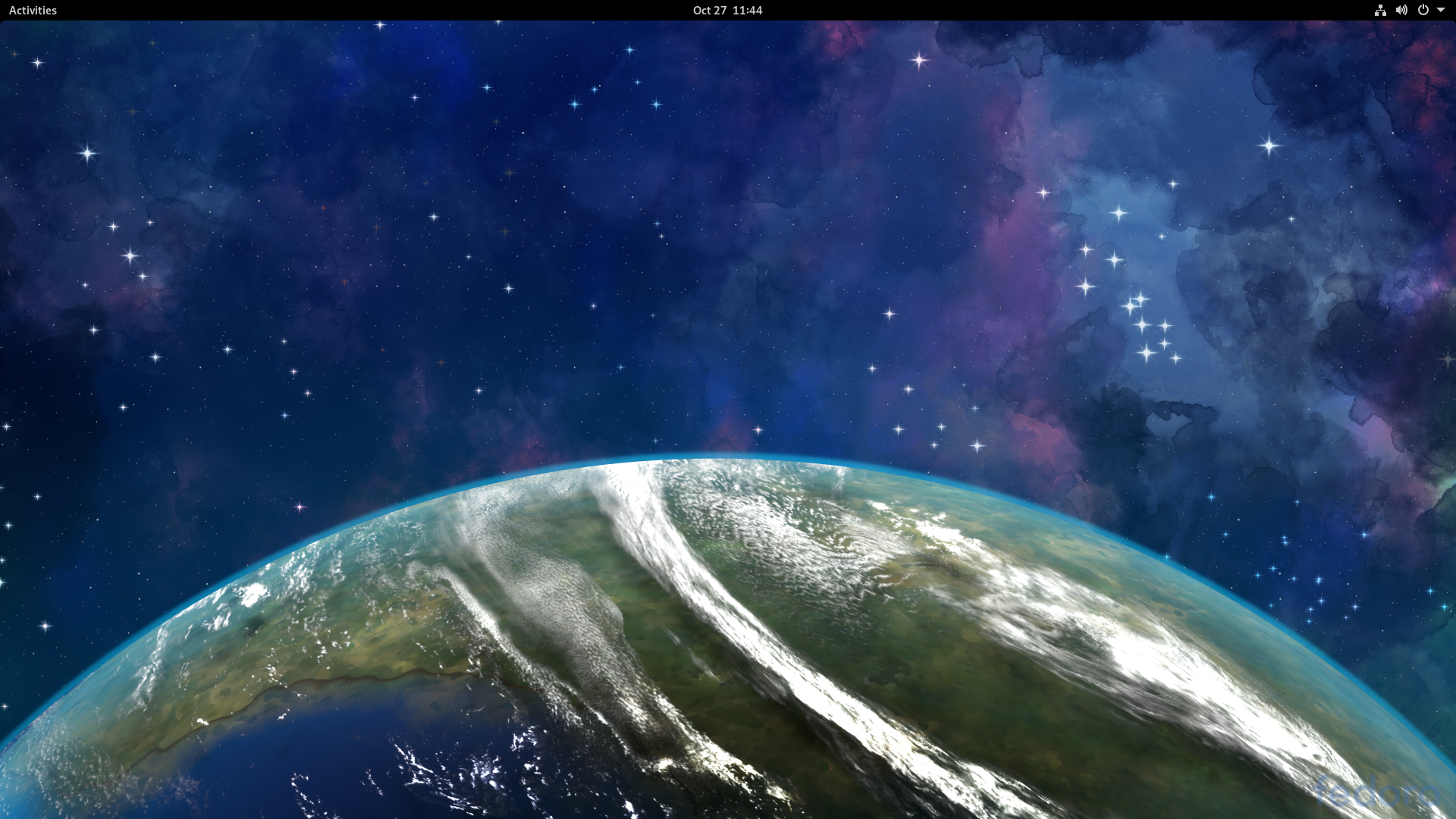
Fedora 33

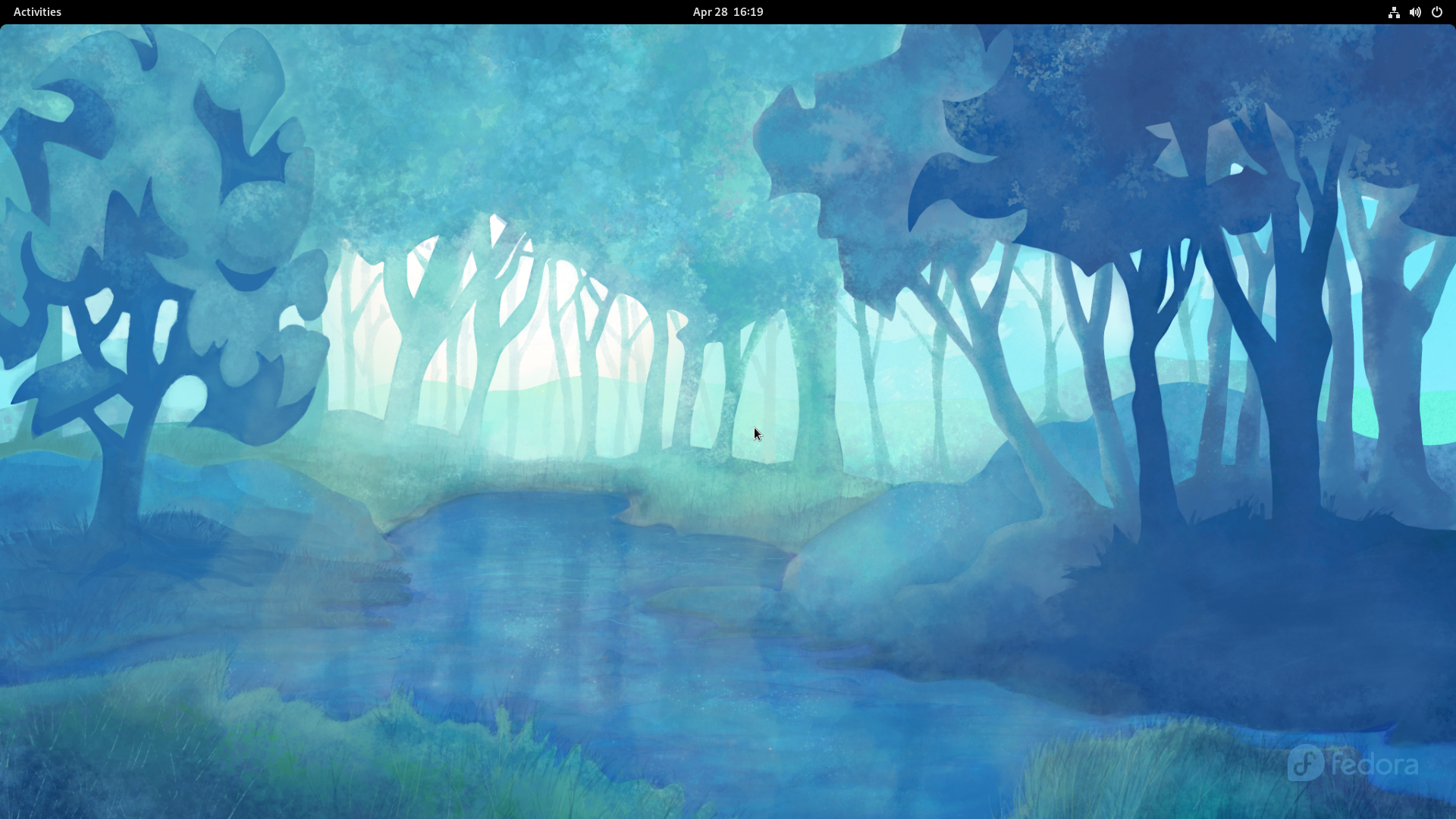
Fedora 34

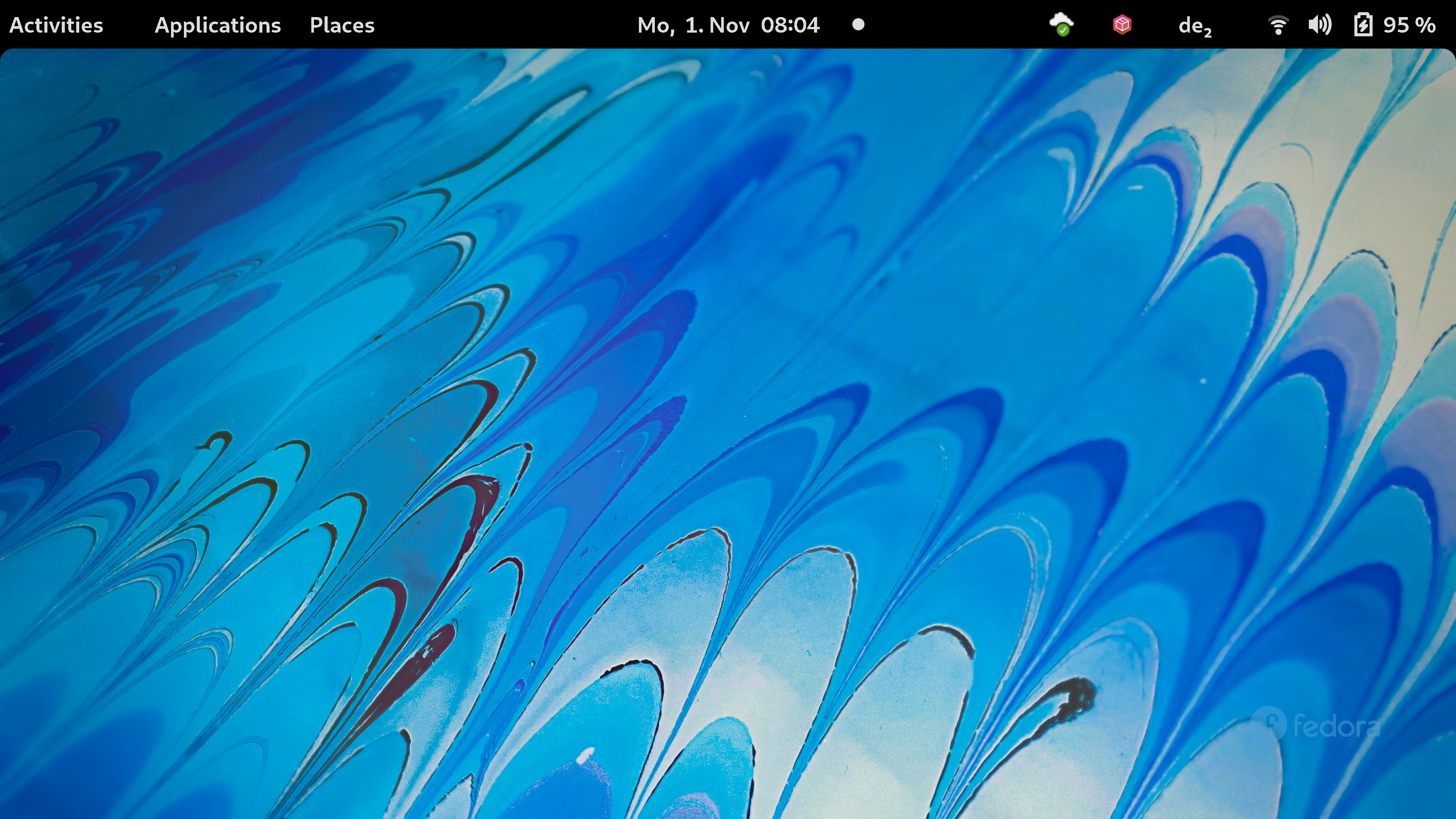
Fedora 35

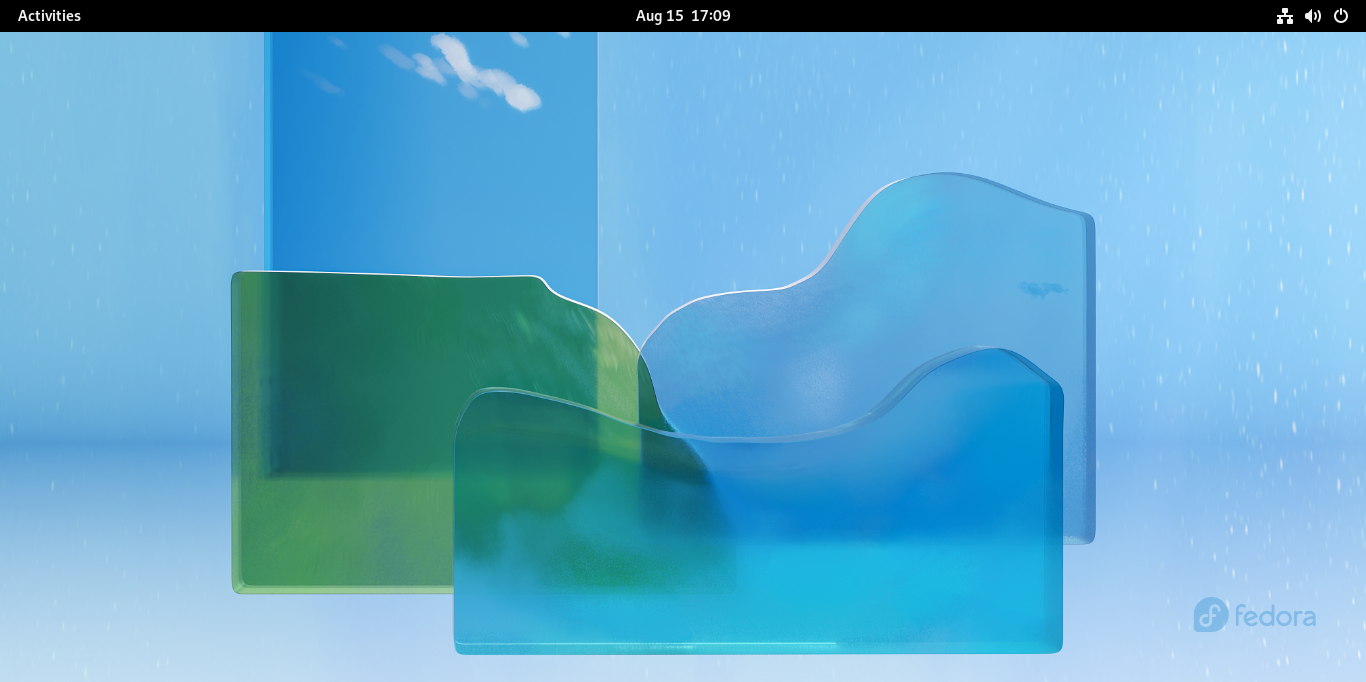
Fedora 36

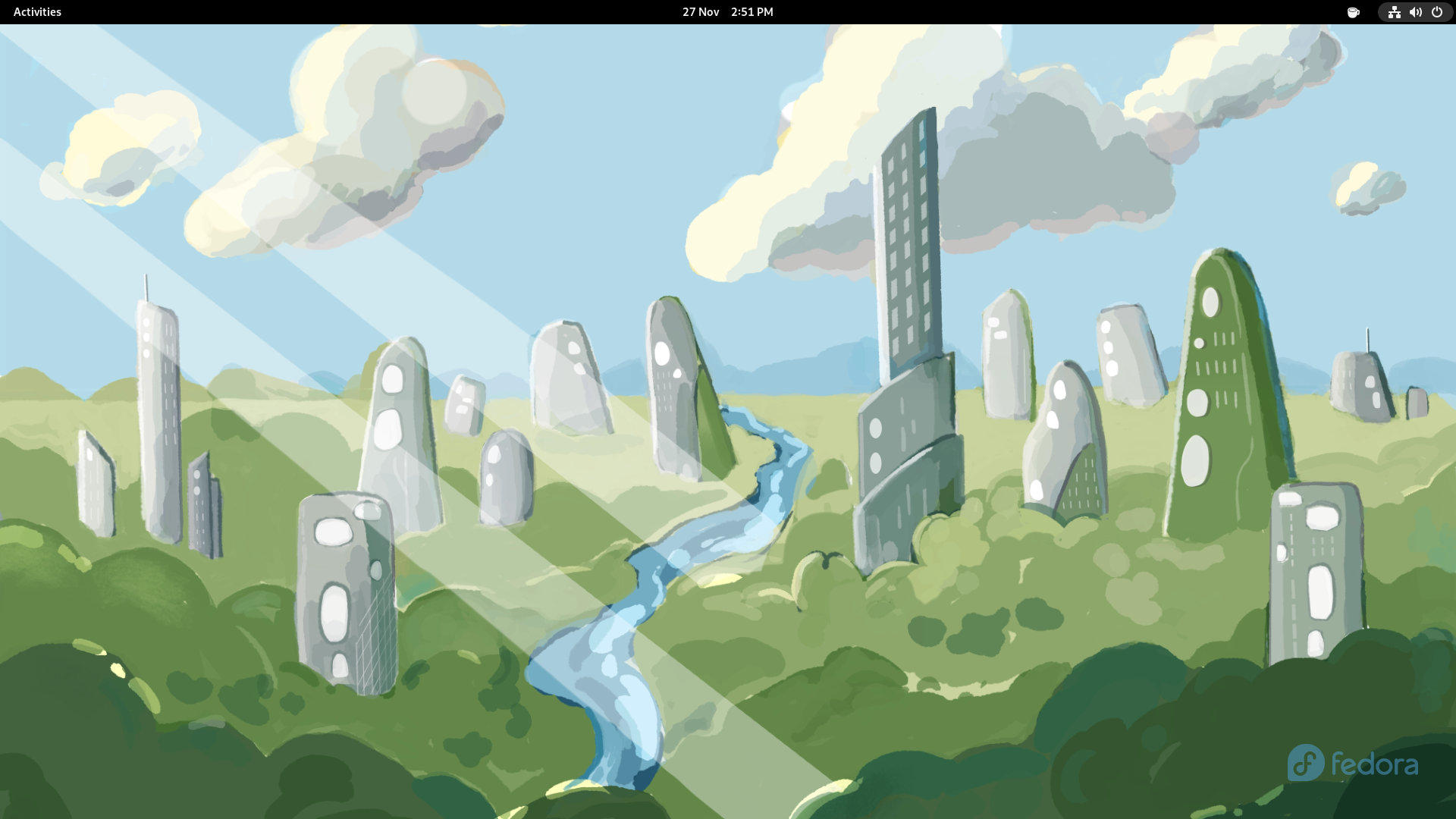
Fedora 37

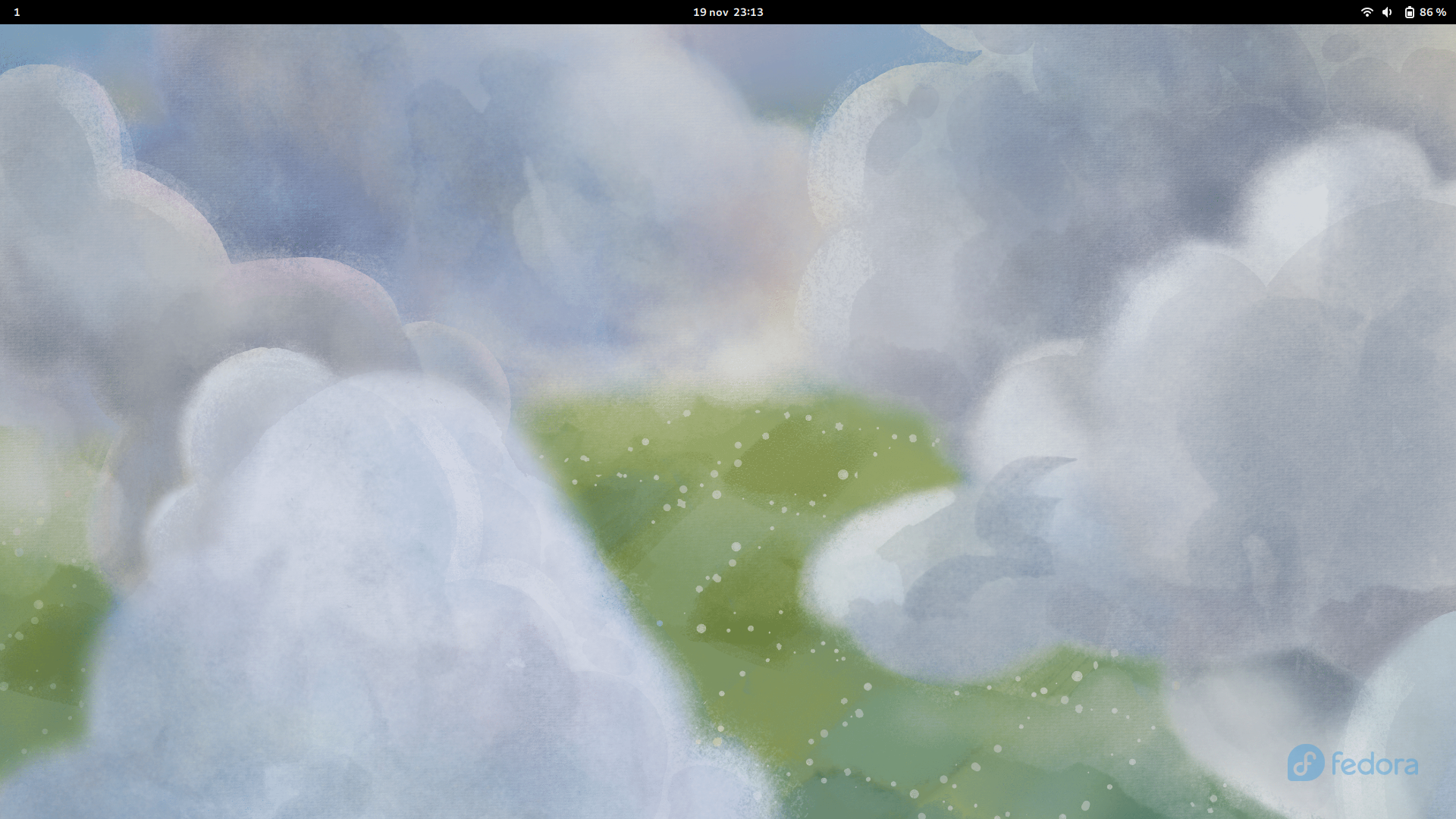
Fedora 38

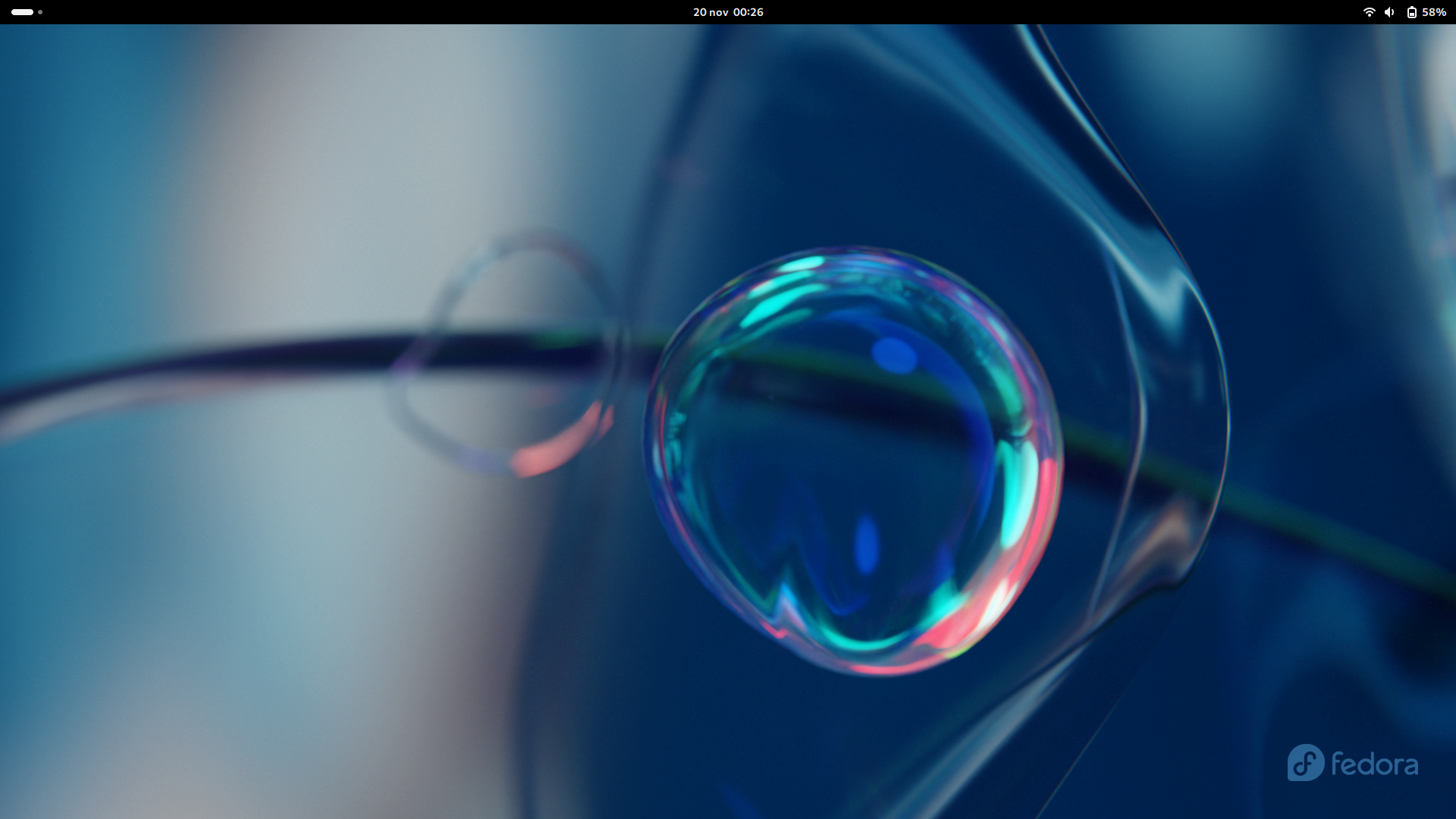
Fedora 39

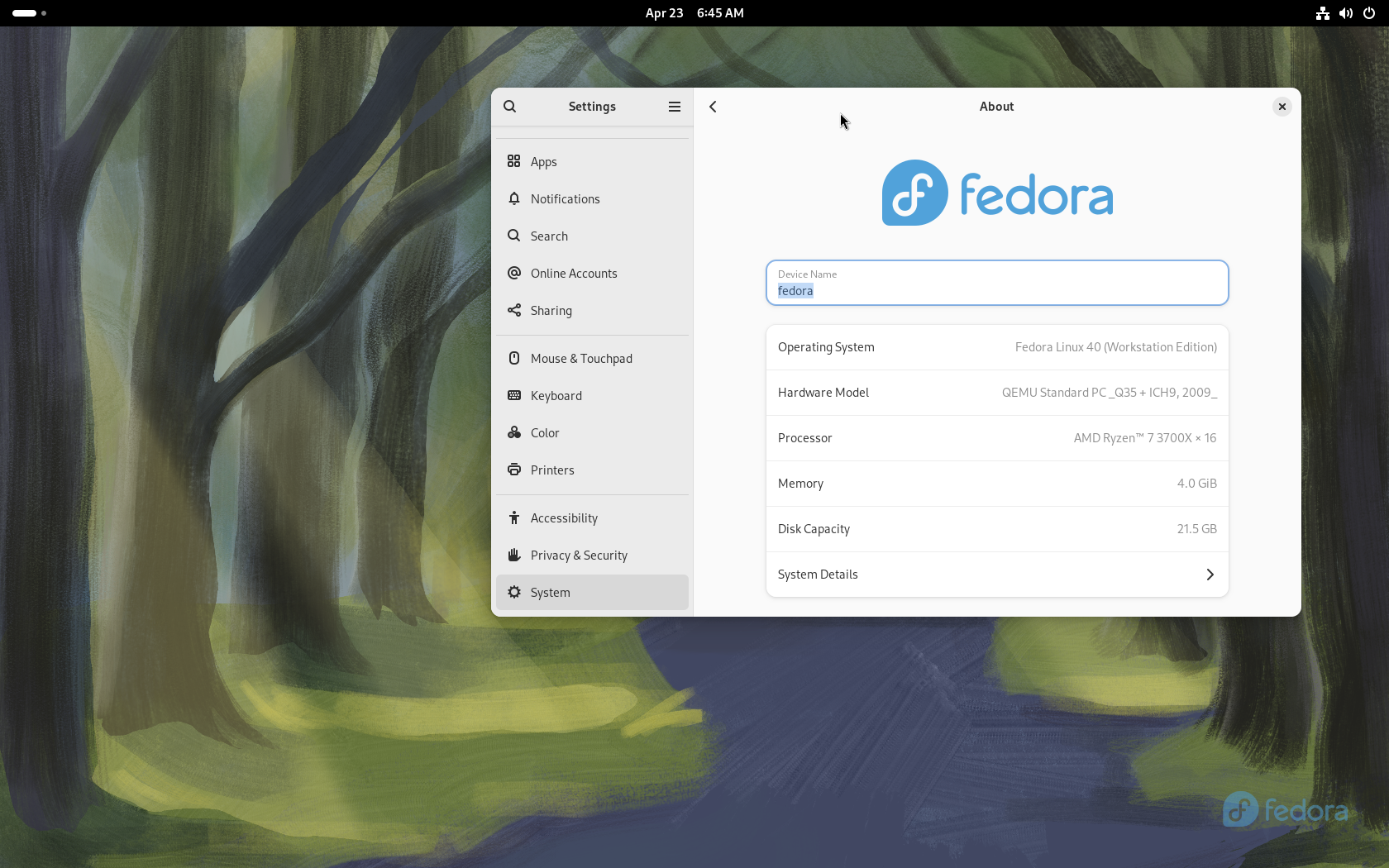
Fedora 40

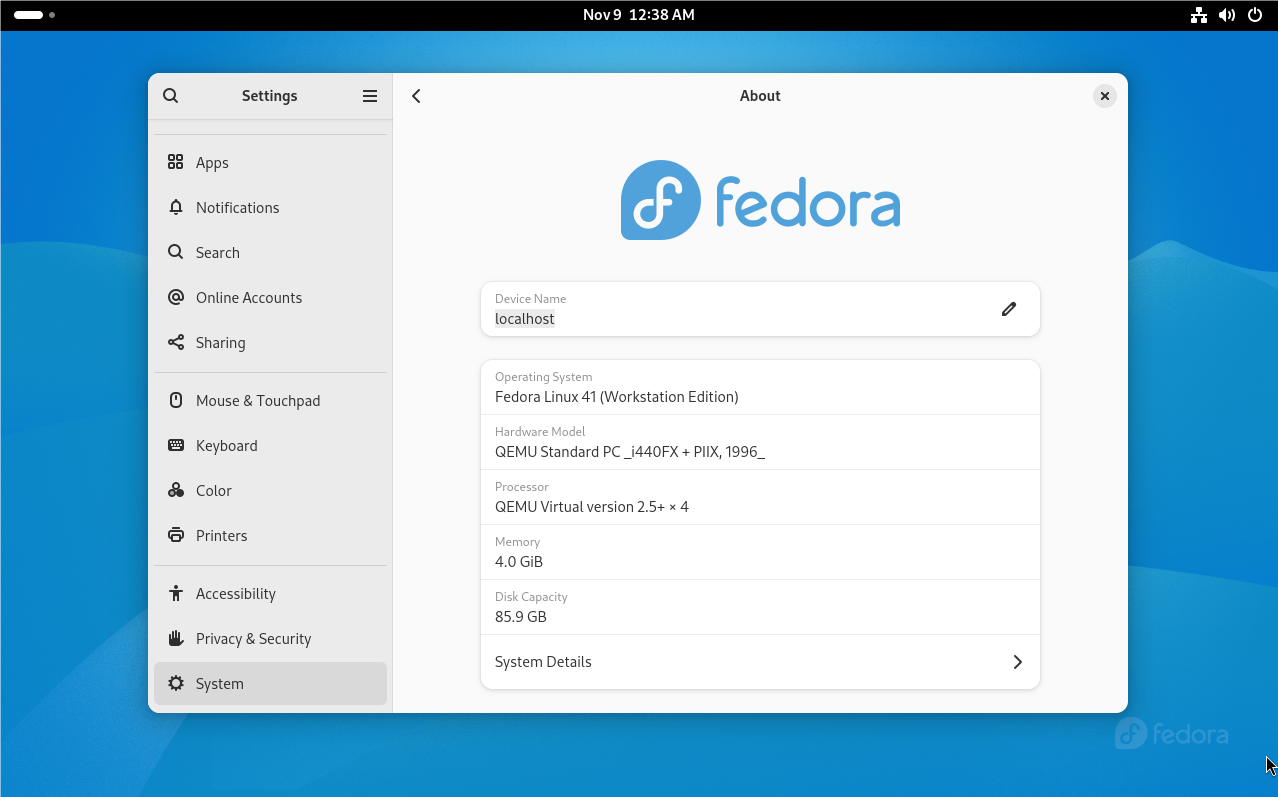
Fedora 41

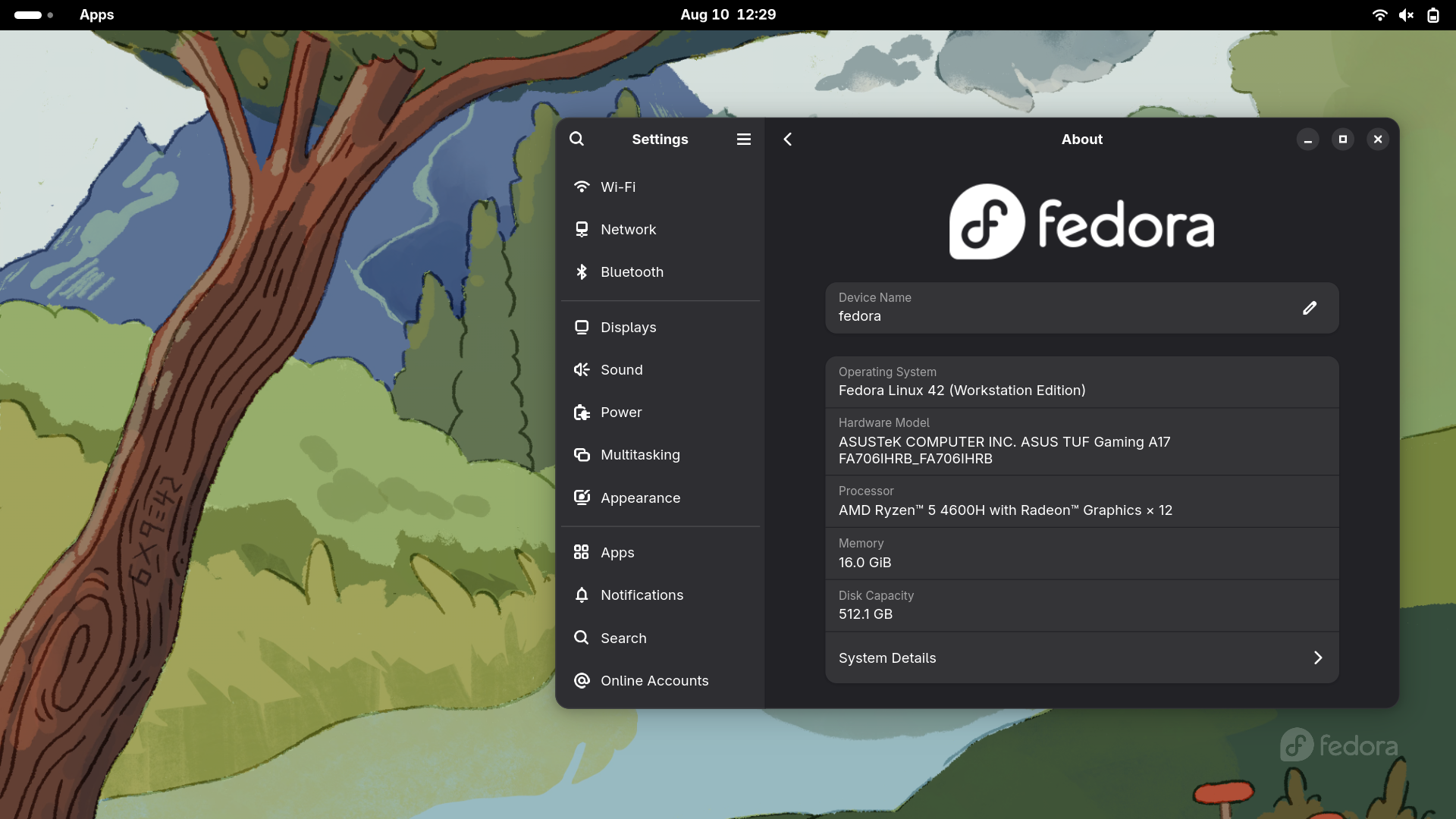
Fedora 42

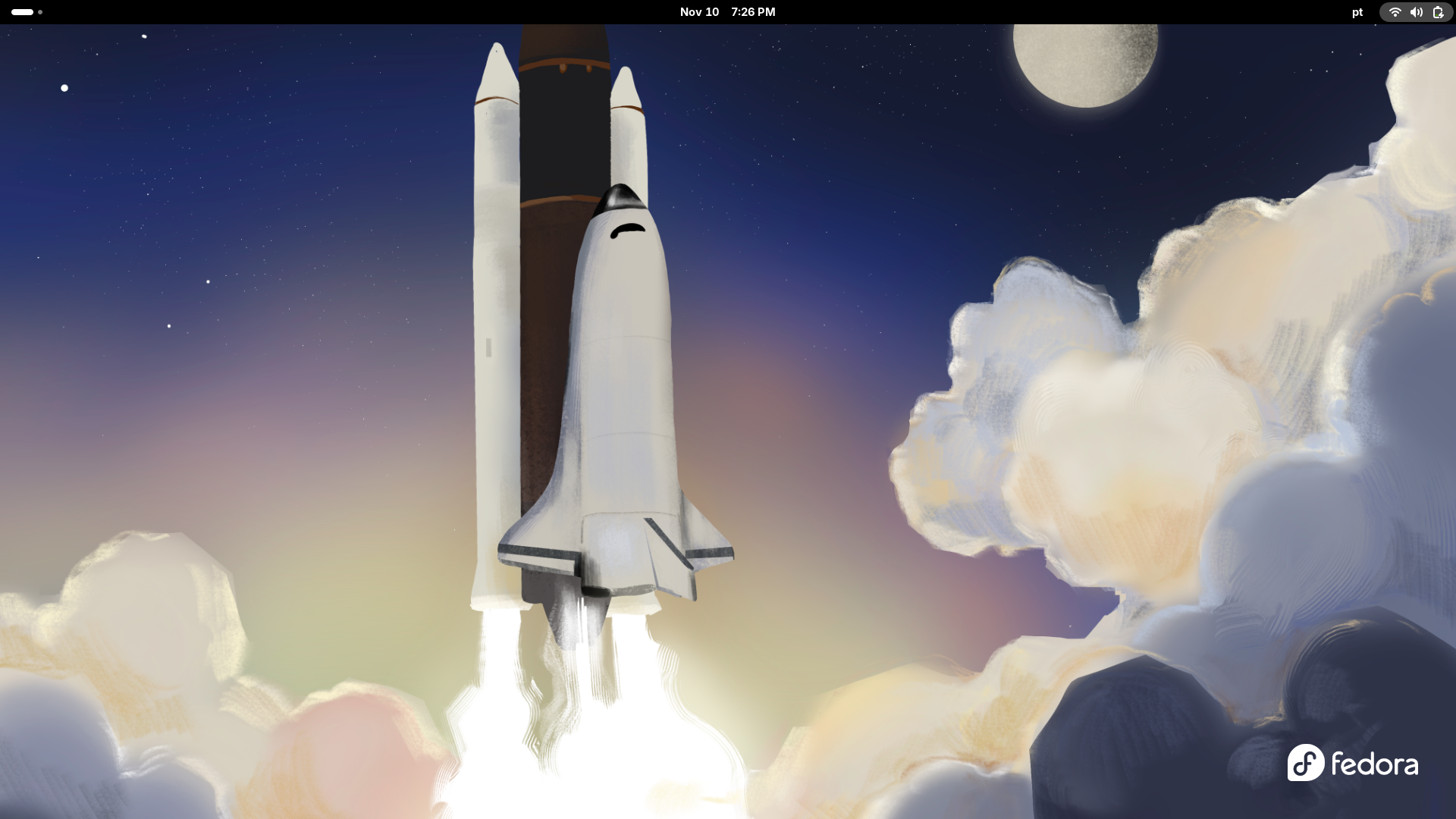
Fedora 43

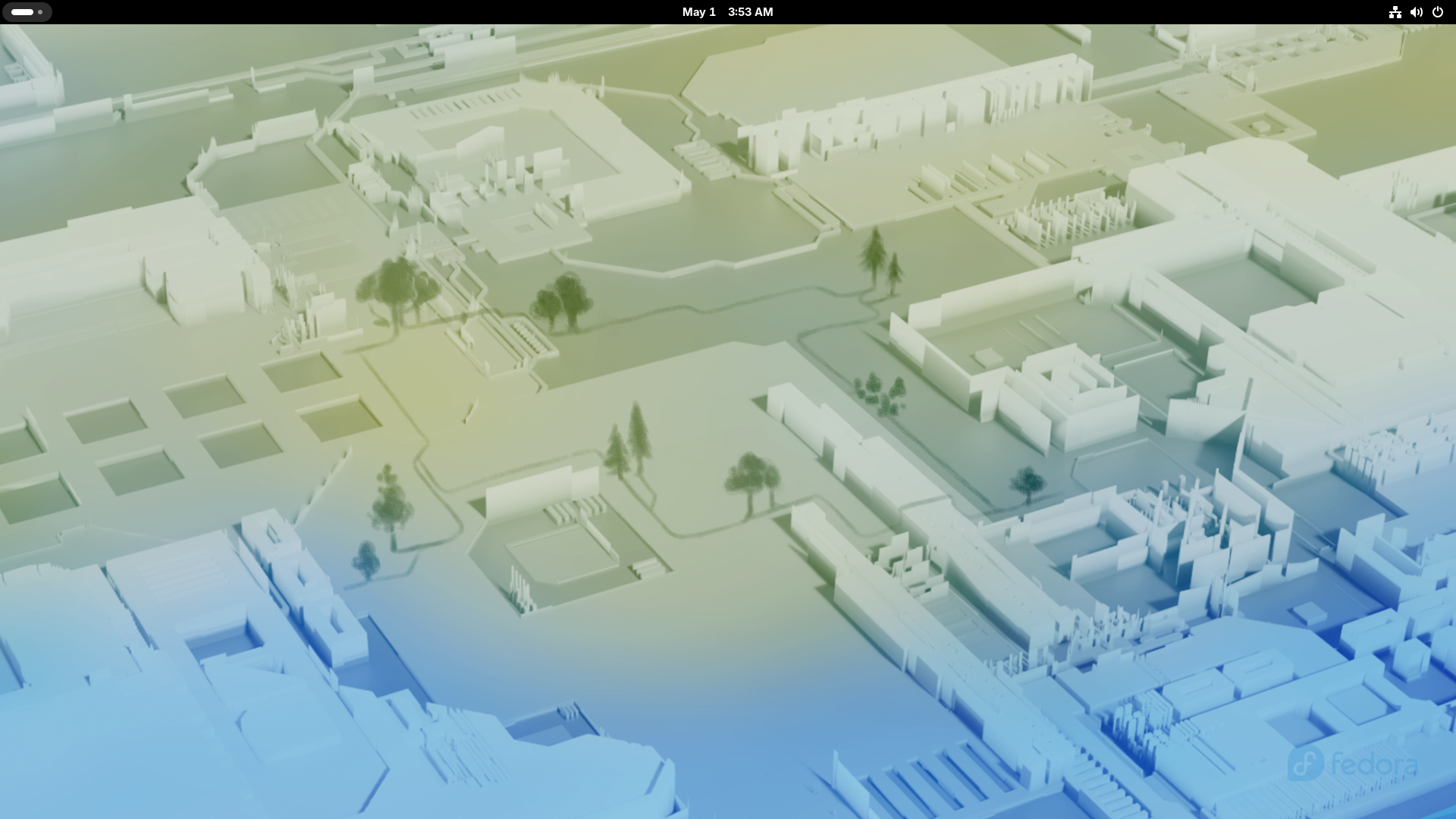
Fedora 44

Fedora 45
