= Turkix =

- Developer: Turkix community
- Written in: C++, Python
- OS family: Linux (Unix-like)
- Working state: Discontinued
- Source model: Open-source software
- Final release: 3.0 / January 7, 2005
- Final preview: 10.0 Alpha / March 17, 2005
- Marketing target: Personal computers
- Available in: Turkish, Azerbaijani, English
- Update method: urpmi (rpmdrake)
- Package manager: RPM Package Manager
- Platforms: IA-32, x86-64
- Kernel type: Monolithic kernel
- Userland: GNU
- Default user interface: KDE Plasma Desktop
- License: GNU GPL v2

Support status
- Discontinued

Turkix was a live Linux distribution, capable of self-installing on hard disk using a graphical wizard. The main goal of Turkix was to provide a very user-friendly Linux environment. Turkix was based on the Mandriva distribution. In visual style Turkix was similar to Windows XP.

First two releases of Turkix (1.0 and 1.9) were in Turkish and Azerbaijani only, but later releases had more language support, especially English.

Latest stable release of Turkix was 3.0, and the last unstable release was 10.0 Alpha. At this point the project was aborted.

== Release history ==
| Name | Version | Release date |
|---|---|---|
| Turkix 1.0 | 1.0 | May 31, 2004 |
| Turkix 1.9 | 1.9 | September 25, 2004 |
| Turkix 3.0 | 3.0 | January 7, 2005 |
| Turkix 10.0 Alpha | 10.0 Alpha | March 17, 2005 |

Old version
Older version, still supported
Latest version
Future release
