= Mandriva Linux =

Linux distribution

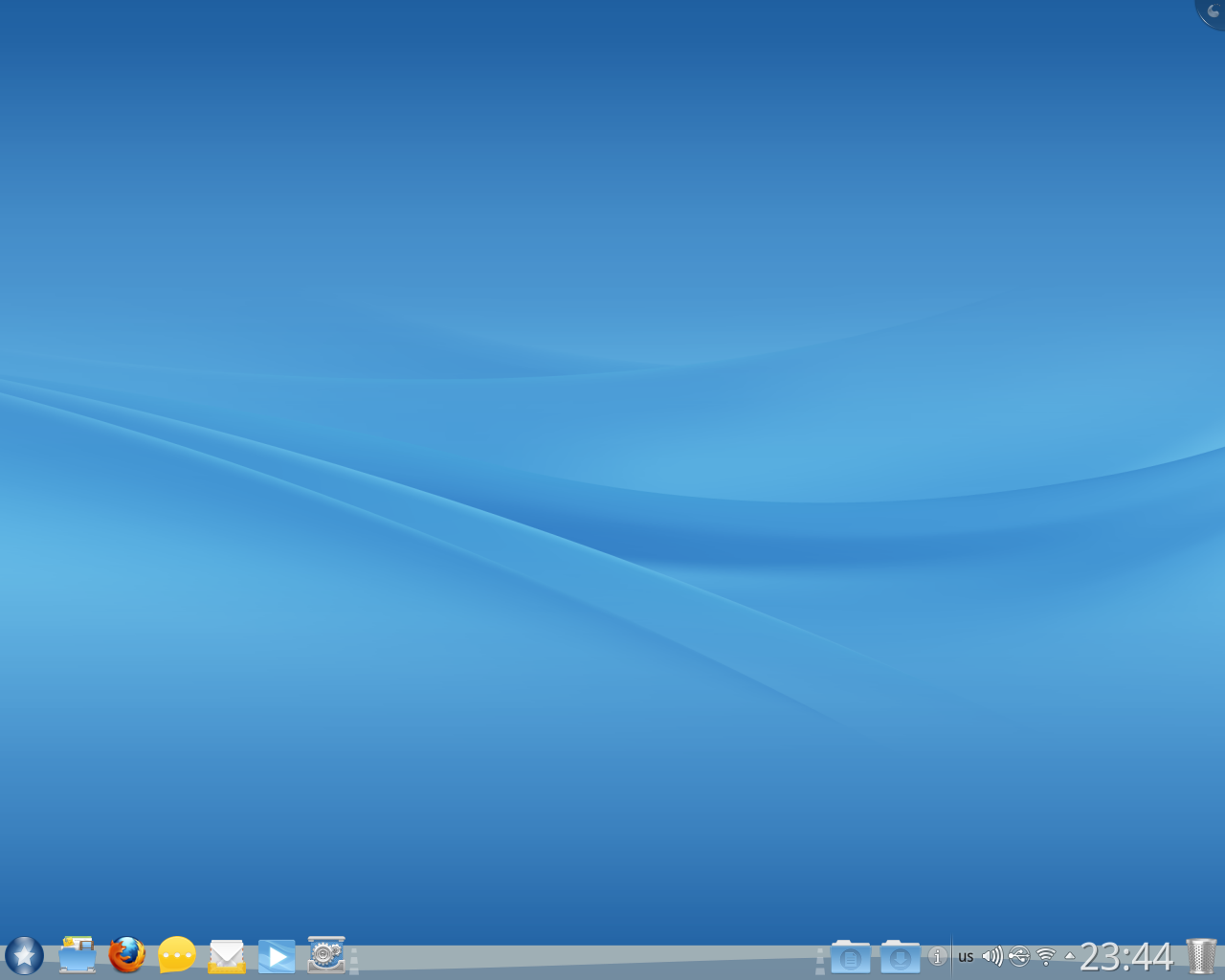
- Mandriva Linux 2011
- Developer: Mandriva
- OS family: Unix-like: Linux
- Working state: Discontinued
- Source model: Open source (with exceptions)
- Initial release: 23 July 1998; 28 years ago
- Final release: 2011.0 / 28 August 2011; 15 years ago
- Final preview: 2011 rc2 / 27 July 2011; 15 years ago
- Available in: Multilingual
- Update method: Long-term support
- Package manager: urpmi (command-line frontend) rpmdrake (GTK frontend).rpm (package format)
- Supported platforms: amd64, i686, i586, i486, i386, sparc64, ppc64, MIPS, arm, IA-64, Xbox
- Kernel type: Monolithic (Linux)
- Userland: GNU
- Default user interface: KDE Plasma Desktop (official)
- License: Various free software licenses, plus proprietary binary blobs
- Official website: Archived 23 May 2015 at the Wayback Machine

Mandriva Linux is a discontinued Linux distribution developed by Mandriva S.A. as a fusion of the French distribution Mandrake Linux and the Brazilian distribution Conectiva Linux.

Each release's lifetime was 18 months for base updates (Linux, system software, etc.) and 12 months for desktop updates (window managers, desktop environments, web browsers, etc.). Server products received full updates for at least five years after their release.

The last release of Mandriva Linux was in August 2011. Most developers who were laid off went on to work on Mageia, while the remaining developers teamed up with community members and formed OpenMandriva, both forks of the Mandriva Linux codebase.

== History ==
The first release of Mandrake was based on Red Hat Linux (version 5.1) and K Desktop Environment 1 in July 1998. After that, it moved away from the Red Hat standard and Red Hat inspiration and influence on its own design and implementation, and became a completely separate distribution. Mandrake included a number of original tools that make system configuration less difficult. It was the brainchild of Gaël Duval, who wanted to focus on ease of use for new users.

This goal was met as Mandrake Linux gained a reputation as "one of the easiest to install and user-friendly Linux distributions". Mandrake Linux earned praise as a Linux distribution that users could use all the time, without dual booting into Microsoft Windows for compatibility with web sites or software unavailable under Linux. CNET called the user experience of Mandrake Linux 8.0 the most polished available at that time.

Duval became the co-founder of Mandrakesoft, but was laid off from the company in 2006 along with many other employees.

=== Name changes ===
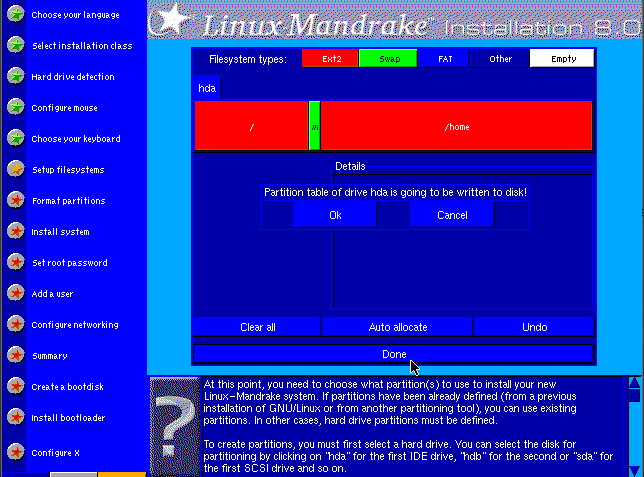
Installation screen of Linux-Mandrake 8.0

From its inception until the release of version 8.0, Mandrake named its flagship distribution Linux-Mandrake. From version 8.1 to 9.2 the distribution name was reversed and called Mandrake Linux.

In February 2004, MandrakeSoft lost a court case against Hearst Corporation, owners of King Features Syndicate. Hearst contended that MandrakeSoft infringed upon King Features' trademarked character Mandrake the Magician. As a precaution, MandrakeSoft renamed its products by removing the space between the brand name and the product name and changing the first letter of the product name to lower case, thus creating one word. Starting from version 10.0, Mandrake Linux became known as mandrakelinux, and its logo changed accordingly. Similarly, MandrakeMove (a Live CD version) became Mandrakemove.

In April 2005, Mandrakesoft announced the corporate acquisition of Conectiva, a Brazilian-based company that produced a Linux distribution for Portuguese-speaking (Brazil) and Spanish-speaking Latin America. As a result of this acquisition and the legal dispute with Hearst Corporation, Mandrakesoft announced that the company was changing its name to Mandriva, and that their Linux distribution Mandrake Linux would henceforward be known as Mandriva Linux.

=== Forks ===
Mandriva has been forked many times.

- Red Hat Linux
- - DemoLinux
  - - ALT Linux
    - - - TinyMe
        - - Granular Linux
          - - Phinx
            - PCLinuxOS
      - - SAM Linux → SAMity Linux
        - - BlackPanther OS
          - - OpenSLS → Annvix
            - - Unity Linux
              - - Mageia
                - - - OpenMandriva Lx
                    - Mandrake Linux → Mandriva
                  - ROSA Linux

== Features ==
=== Installation, control and administration ===
Mandriva Linux contained the Mandriva Control Center, which eases configuration of some settings. It has many programs known as Drakes or Draks, collectively named drakxtools, to configure many different settings. Examples include MouseDrake to set up a mouse, DiskDrake to set up disk partitions and drakconnect to set up a network connection. They are written using GTK+ and Perl, and most of them can run in both graphical and text mode using the ncurses interface.

=== Desktops ===
Mandriva Linux 2011 was released only with KDE Plasma Desktop, whereas other desktop environments were available but not officially supported. Older Mandriva versions also used KDE as standard but others such as GNOME were also supported.

=== Package manager ===
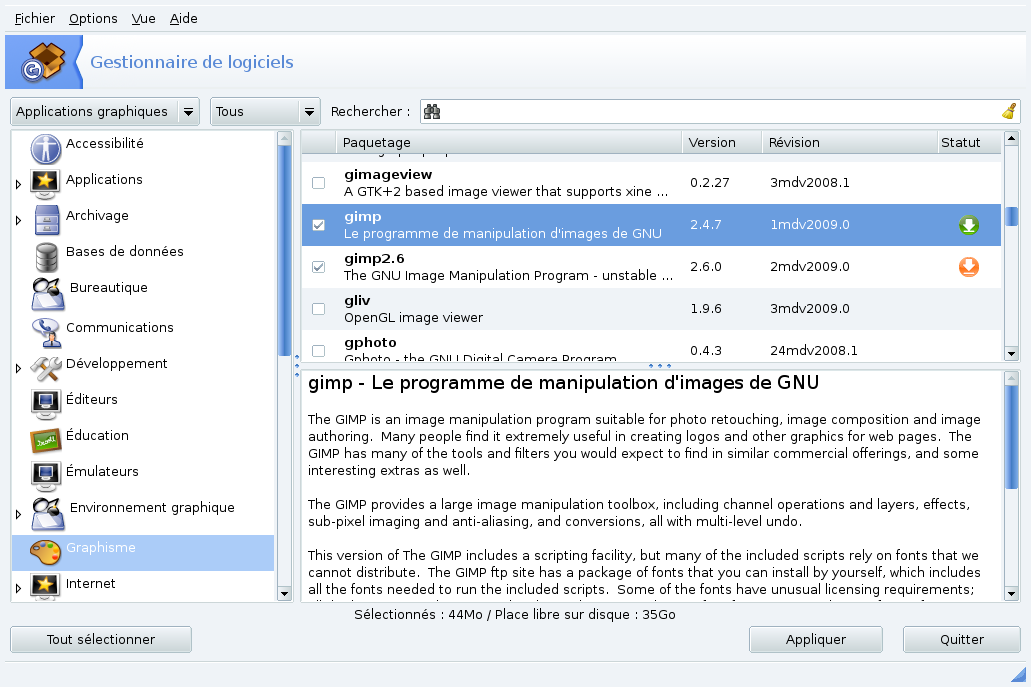
Rpmdrake, Mandriva's graphical package manager

Mandriva Linux used a package manager called urpmi, which functions as a wrapper to the .rpm binaries. It is similar to apt from Debian & Ubuntu, pacman from Arch Linux, yum or DNF from Fedora in that it allows seamless installation of a given software package by automatically installing the other packages needed. It is also media-transparent due to its ability to retrieve packages from various media, including network/Internet, CD/DVD and local disk. Urpmi also has an easy-to-use graphical front-end called rpmdrake, which is integrated into the Mandriva Control Center.

=== Live USB ===
A Live USB of Mandriva Linux can be created manually or with UNetbootin.

== Versions ==
From 2007–2011, Mandriva was released on a 6-month fixed-release cycle, similar to Ubuntu and Fedora.

=== Latest version ===
The latest stable version is Mandriva Linux 2011 ("Hydrogen"), released on 28 August 2011.

=== Development version ===
The development tree of Mandriva Linux has always been known as Cooker. This tree is directly released as a new stable version.

=== Version history ===
This table shows how Mandriva developed over time.

==== Mandrake releases ====
Date	Number	Name	Major features
1998-07	5.1	Venice	First release based on RedHat Linux; KDE 1.0
1998-12	5.2	Leeloo	
1999-02	5.3	Festen	KDE 1.1; Last release with Kernel 2.0 series
1999-05	6.0	Venus	Kernel 2.2.9; GNOME 1.0.9
1999-09	6.1	Helios	
2000-01	7.0	Air	Includes drakxtools 1.0 and urpmi 0.9, these packages later became most notable features among Mandrake/Mandriva based distributions.
2000-05	7.1	Helium	Last release with KDE 1.1.x series
2000-09	7.2	Odyssey (called Ulysses during beta)	KDE 2.0; Last release with Kernel 2.2 series
2001-03	8.0	Traktopel	Kernel 2.4.3; KDE 2.1.1
2001-09	8.1	Vitamin	KDE 2.2.1
2002-03	8.2	Bluebird	Last release with KDE 2.2 series
2002-09	9.0	Dolphin	KDE 3.0.3; OpenOffice.org 1.0.1; Gnome 2.0.2
2003-03	9.1	Bamboo	Introduce "Galaxy" theme; KDE 3.1
2003-09	9.2	FiveStar	Last release with Kernel 2.4 series
2004-03	10.0	Community and Official	Kernel 2.6.3; KDE 3.2.0; Last release with XFree86 4.3
2004-10	10.1	Community and Official	X11 r6.7.0 replaced XFree86; Use scim as unified i18n input method platform
2005-04	10.2 / 2005 LE	Limited Edition 2005	KDE 3.3.2; "Mandrake" brand removed from artworks (wallpaper, splash, etc.)

==== Mandriva releases ====
Date	Number	Name	Major features
2005-10	2006.0	Mandriva Linux 2006	KDE 3.4.2; First release with Mandriva branding; Support upgrade from Conectiva; Last release with "Galaxy" theme
2006-10	2007	Mandriva Linux 2007	KDE 3.5; New theme "la Ora"; Rpmdrake package manager ui redesign; X.org server 1.1.1
2007-04	2007.1	Mandriva Linux 2007 Spring	
2007-10	2008.0	Mandriva Linux 2008	
2008-04-09	2008.1	Mandriva Linux 2008 Spring	Last release with KDE 3.5 series
2008-10	2009.0	Mandriva Linux 2009	DrakX installer redesign; KDE 4.1.2
2009-04-29	2009.1	Mandriva Linux 2009 Spring	
2009-11	2010.0	Mandriva Linux 2010	
2010-07	2010.1	Mandriva Linux 2010 Spring	
2010-12	2010.2	Mandriva Linux 2010.2	Last release with Ia Ora theme
2011-08-28	2011.0	Hydrogen	use rpm5.org fork; KDE desktop customized by Rosalab

== Editions ==
Each release of Mandriva Linux was split into several different editions. Each edition is derived from the same master tree, most of which is available on the public mirrors: all free / open source software, and all non-free software which is under a license that allows unrestricted distribution to the general public, is available from the public mirrors. Only commercial software under a license that does not allow unrestricted distribution to the general public (but for which Mandriva has negotiated an agreement to distribute it with paid copies) is not available from public mirrors.

=== Mandriva Linux Free ===
Mandriva Linux Free was a 'traditional' distribution (i.e. one that comes with a dedicated installer, to install the distribution to the computer before it is run). It consists entirely of free and open-source software, and it was made available for public download at no charge. It was usually available in CD (three or four discs) and DVD editions for x86 32- and 64-bit CPU architectures. It was aimed at users to whom software freedom is important, and also at users who prefer a traditional installer to the installable live CD system used by One. The package selection was tailored towards regular desktop use. It consisted of a subset of packages from the 'main' and 'contrib' sections of the master tree. Mandriva Linux Free was phased in 2011 in favor of a single edition approach with Mandriva Desktop 2011.

=== Mandriva Linux One ===
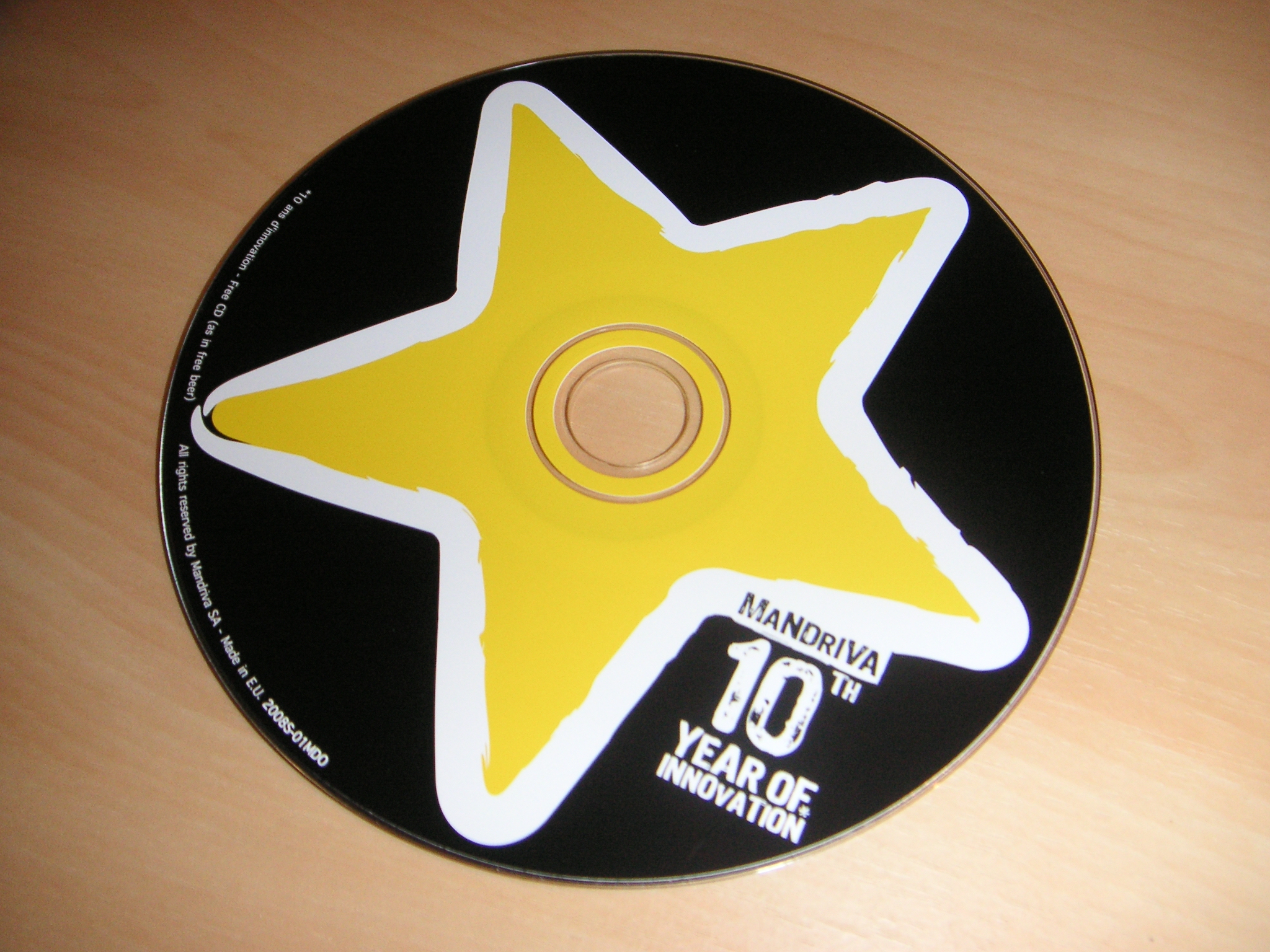
Mandriva Linux One's Live CD

Mandriva Linux One was a free to download hybrid distribution, being both a Live CD and an installer (with an installation wizard that includes disk partitioning tools).

Several Mandriva Linux One versions were provided for each Mandriva Linux release preceding Mandriva 2008. Users could choose between different languages, select either the KDE or GNOME desktops and include or exclude non-free software. The default version included the KDE desktop with non-free software included. The One images consist of a subset of packages from the 'main', 'contrib' and 'non-free' sections of the master tree, with the documentation files stripped from the packages to save space.

Mandriva Linux One 2008 has a smaller range of versions. There are KDE and GNOME versions with the default set of languages. There are also two KDE versions with alternative sets of languages. All versions include non-free software.

=== Mandriva Linux Powerpack ===
Mandriva Linux Powerpack was a 'traditional' distribution (in other words, one that comes with a dedicated installer, DrakX, which is first used to install the distribution to the hard disk of the computer before it is run). It is the main commercial edition of Mandriva Linux, and as such, requires payment for its use. It contains several non-free packages intended to add value for the end user, including non-free drivers like the NVIDIA and ATI graphics card drivers, non-free firmware for wireless chips and modems, some browser plugins such as Java and Flash, and some full applications such as Cedega, Adobe Reader and RealPlayer. It was sold directly from the Mandriva Store website and through authorized resellers. It was also made available via a subscription service, which allowed unlimited downloads of Powerpack editions for the last few Mandriva releases for a set yearly fee. It consisted of a subset of packages from the 'main', 'contrib', 'non-free' and 'restricted' sections of the master tree.

In Mandriva Linux 2008, the Discovery and Powerpack+ editions were merged into Powerpack, which became Mandriva's only commercial offering. Users were able to choose between a novice-friendly Discovery-like setup or an installation process and desktop aimed at power users.

=== Mandriva Linux Discovery ===
Mandriva Linux Discovery was a commercial distribution aimed at first-time and novice Linux users. It was sold via the Mandriva Store website and authorized resellers, or could be downloaded by some subscribers to the Mandriva Club. Mandriva Linux 2008 does not include a Discovery edition, having added optional novice-friendly features to the Powerpack edition.

In releases prior to Mandriva Linux 2007, Discovery was a 'traditional' distribution built on the DrakX installer. In Mandriva Linux 2007 and 2007 Spring, Discovery is a hybrid "Live DVD" which can be booted without installation or installed to hard disk in the traditional manner.

Discovery was a DVD rather than a CD, allowing all languages to be provided on one disc. It consisted of a subset of packages from the 'main', 'contrib', 'non-free' and 'non-free-restricted' sections of the master tree. The package selection was tailored towards novice desktop users. A theme chosen to be appealing to novice users was used, and the 'simplified' menu layout in which applications are described rather than named and not all applications are included was the default (for all other editions, the default menu layout was the 'traditional' layout, where all graphical applications installed on the system were included and were listed by name).

=== Mandriva Linux Powerpack+ ===
Mandriva Linux Powerpack+ was a version of Powerpack with additional packages, mostly commercial software. Like Powerpack, it was sold directly from the Mandriva Store website and through authorized resellers; it was also a free download for Mandriva Club members of the Gold level and above. Powerpack+ was aimed at SOHO (small office / home office) users, with the expectation that it could be used to run a small home or office server machine as well as desktop and development workstations. The package selection was tailored with this in mind, including a wide range of server packages. It consisted of a subset of packages from the 'main', 'contrib', 'non-free' and 'restricted' sections of the master tree.

Mandriva 2008 no longer includes a Powerpack+ edition; instead, the Powerpack edition includes all the available packages.

== Derivatives ==
Derivatives are distributions that are based on Mandriva Linux, some by Mandriva itself, others by independent projects. Some maintain compatibility with Mandriva Linux, so that installing a Mandriva Linux .rpm also works on the offspring.

- blackPanther OS - initially derived from Mandrake
- OpenMandriva Lx - a continuation of Mandriva by the community
- Mageia - a fork of Mandriva by the former laid off developers
- PCLinuxOS - initially derived from Mandrake
- ROSA Linux - a fork of Mandriva by the former Russian Mandriva partner, ROSA Labs
- Alt Linux - originally Russian Mandrake Linux
- Moondrake GNU/Linux - unconfirmed(?), official continuation by project leader Per Øyvind Notsure Norli Karlsen, hibernating (?)
