= OpenMandriva Lx =

Independent Linux distribution

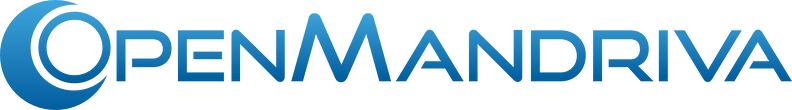

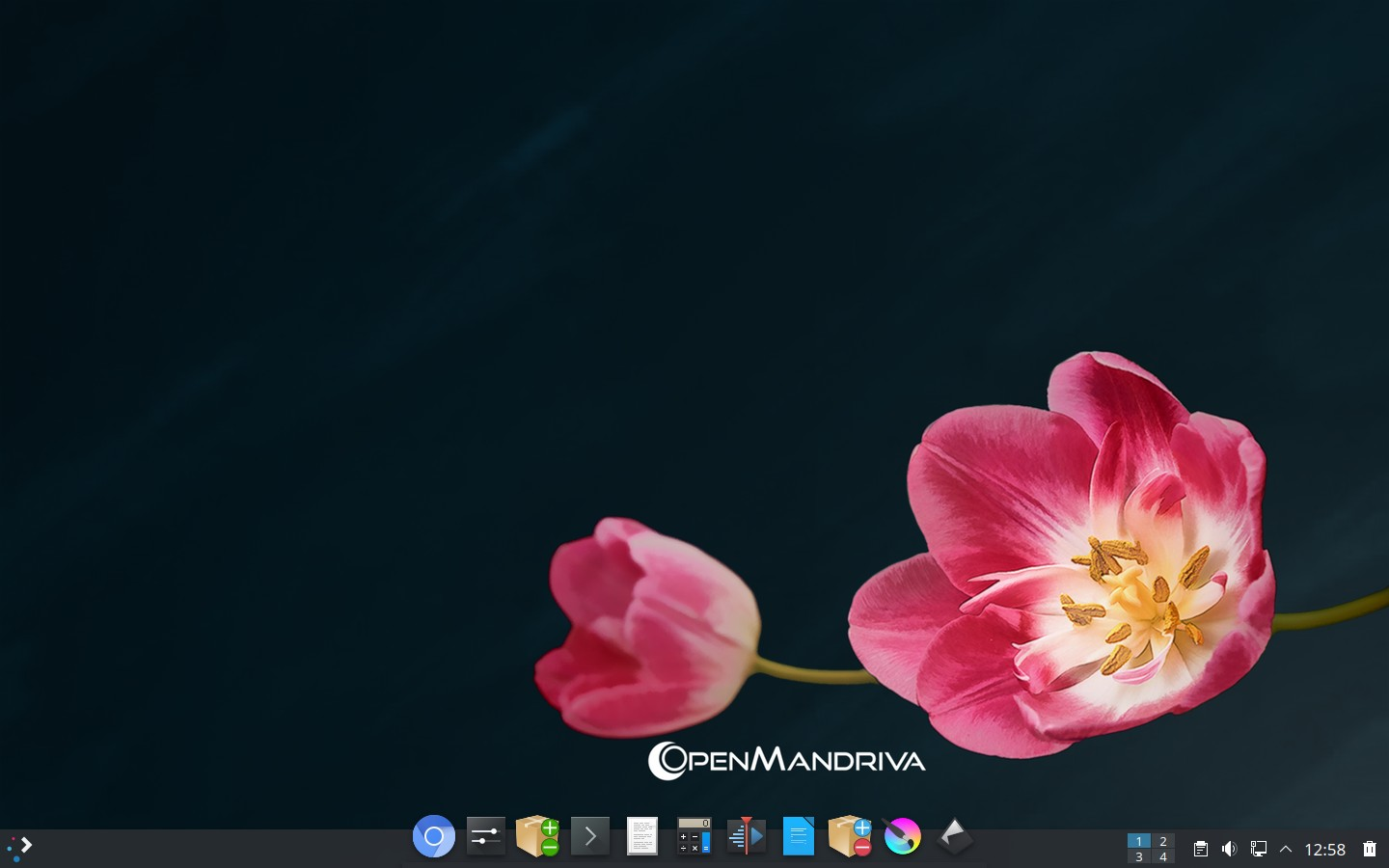
- ROME rolling edition Plasma desktop
- Developer: OpenMandriva Association and Cooker group
- OS family: Unix-like (Linux kernel)
- Working state: Current
- Source model: Open source
- Initial release: November 22, 2013; 12 years ago
- Latest release: 6.0 / 20 April 2025; 17 months ago
- Repository: github.com/OpenMandrivaAssociation/
- Update method: dnf (command line), dnfdrake and dnfdragora (GUI)
- Package manager: DNF (RPMv4)
- Supported platforms: AMD64, ARM64
- Kernel type: Monolithic (Linux)
- Userland: GNU
- Default user interface: KDE Plasma 6, LXQt, GNOME
- License: Free software (mainly GPL)
- Official website: www.openmandriva.org

OpenMandriva Lx is a general-purpose Linux distribution maintained by the OpenMandriva Association for x86_64 (64-bit) and ARM computers. It is a community-supported continuation of Mandriva Linux, which was active from 1998 (as Mandrake) until 2011. OpenMandriva is offered in a stable release edition, and (since 2023) a rolling release edition named Rome. It uses the RPM Package Manager and KDE Plasma as its default desktop environment.

OpenMandriva Lx's development environment is an ABF (Automated Build Farm) which can manage the source code and compile it to binaries. ABF also creates the package repository and ISO images.

== Origins ==
OpenMandriva Lx is a community Linux distribution. Originally an offering of Mandriva Linux, the OpenMandriva product was created in May, 2012, when Mandriva S.A. avoided bankruptcy by abandoning the development of its consumer product to the Mandriva community.

The OpenMandriva Association was established on December 12, 2012, under 1901 French law, to represent the OpenMandriva Community.

- Red Hat Linux
- - DemoLinux
  - - ALT Linux
    - - - TinyMe
        - - Granular Linux
          - - Phinx
            - PCLinuxOS
      - - SAM Linux → SAMity Linux
        - - BlackPanther OS
          - - OpenSLS → Annvix
            - - Unity Linux
              - - Mageia
                - - - OpenMandriva Lx
                    - Mandrake Linux → Mandriva
                  - ROSA Linux

== Development and versions ==
=== OpenMandriva Lx 2013.0 ===
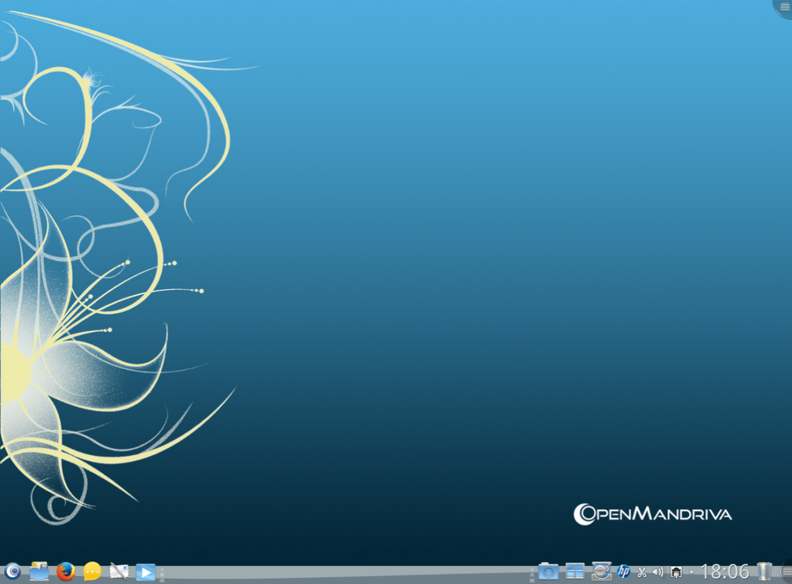
OpenMandriva Lx 2013.0

OpenMandriva Lx 2013.0 was released on November 22, 2013, with codename "Oxygen".

This version was the first release of OpenMandriva Lx, and was the fork of Mandriva Linux 2011.0, which was itself an amalgamation of ROSA Linux and Mandriva Linux. The version includes KDE 4.11.2. Menu in OpenMandriva Lx 2013.0 was SimpleWelcome, and also this version included media player ROSA Media Player 1.6, Mozilla Firefox 25.0, LibreOffice 4.1.3 and the Linux kernel 3.11.6.

=== OpenMandriva Lx 2014.x ===
OpenMandriva Lx 2014 "Phosphorus" was released on 1 May 2014. The release had a very positive review from one of the founders of the initial Mandrake Linux distribution, Gaël Duval.

OpenMandriva Lx 2014.2, codenamed "The Scion", a bugfix release for 2014.1, was released on 29 June 2015.

=== OpenMandriva 3.x ===
During 2015, OpenMandriva released an alpha version of OpenMandriva Lx 2015. As the operating system was developed all 2015 year, in 2016, the version was released as OpenMandriva Lx 3.0 Beta. This new release came with significant changes to the core system — among other things, it was the first desktop Linux distribution that was built completely with the Clang compiler instead of GCC.

A stable and final release of OpenMandriva Lx 3.0 was released in August 2016, followed by 3.01 in December 2016 and 3.02 in June 2017. This was followed by OpenMandriva Lx 3.03, which was released in November 2017.

After releasing OpenMandriva Lx 3.03, OpenMandriva Lx developers started dropping support of i586 processor architecture in OpenMandriva Lx 4.0.

=== OpenMandriva Lx 4.x ===
The development of OpenMandriva Lx 4.0 continued on for two years after Lx 3.03 was released. The first alpha version of OpenMandriva Lx 4.0 was released on 6 September 2018. The OpenMandriva Lx 4.0 Major Release Alpha 1 was released on 25 December 2018, the Beta was released on 9 February 2019 and the Release Candidate was released on 12 May 2019.

The OpenMandriva Lx 4.0 stable release arrived in June 2019. Among many other changes, this release is notable for switching to the DNF package manager for software management, including dnfdragora to replace rpmdrake.

OpenMandriva Lx 4.0 supports ARM64 (aarch64) and ARM v7 (armv7hnl) architectures. After arriving RISC-V board, OpenMandriva will start porting distribution to open source CPUs.

OpenMandriva Lx 4.3 was released in February 2022. One of the notable changes in this version is that PipeWire became OpenMandriva default sound server replacing PulseAudio.

OpenMandriva Lx 4.3 final release was announced on 7 February 2022.

=== OpenMandriva Lx 5.x ===
Version 5.0 of OpenMandriva Lx was released on 25 November 2023.

=== OpenMandriva Lx 6.x ===
Version 6.0 of OpenMandriva Lx was released on 20 April 2025.

=== OpenMandriva ROME (the rolling edition) ===
In January 2023 the OpenMandriva community released their "ROME" edition, a rolling distribution designed for individual users. This version will always contain the latest versions of available software packages.

== Version history ==
=== Stable branch ===
| Version | Code name | Release date | End-of-life date | Kernel version |
|---|---|---|---|---|
| 2013.0 | Oxygen | 2013-11-22 | 2014-05-28 | 3.11.8 |
| 2014.0 | Phosphorus | 2014-05-09 | 2017-11-21 | 3.13.11 |
| 2014.1 | Phosphorus | 2014-10-26 | 2017-11-21 | 3.15.10 |
| 2014.2 | The Scion | 2015-06-29 | 2017-11-21 | 3.18.12 |
| 3.0 | Einsteinium | 2016-08-14 | 2019-07-16 | 4.6.5 |
| 3.01 | Einsteinium | 2016-12-25 | 2019-07-16 | 4.9.0 |
| 3.02 | Einsteinium | 2017-06-21 | 2019-07-16 | 4.11.3 |
| 3.03 | Einsteinium | 2017-11-21 | 2019-07-16 | 4.13.12 |
| 4.0 | Nitrogen | 2019-06-16 | 2020-03-01 | 5.1.9 |
| 4.1 | Mercury | 2020-02-01 | 2021-03-12 | 5.5.5 |
| 4.2 | Argon | 2021-02-12 | 2022-03-07 | 5.10.14 |
| 4.3 | Dysprosium | 2022-02-07 | 1 month after 5.0 release | 5.16.7 |
| 5.0 | Iodine | 2023-11-25 | 1 month after next release | 6.3.x |
| 6.0 | Vanadium | 2025-04-20 | 1 month after next release | 6.14.2 |
| ROME | ROME | 2023-01-07 | rolling release | 6.14.x |
Legend: Unsupported Supported Latest version Future version

=== Development versions ===
| Version | Release date | Kernel version |
|---|---|---|
| 4.1 RC1 | 28 January 2020 | 5.5.0 |
| 4.1 Alpha | 10 November 2019 | 5.3.9 |
| 4.0 RC | 12 May 2019 | 5.1.0 |
| 4.0 Beta | 9 February 2019 | 4.20.4 |
| 4.0 Major Release Alpha 1 | 25 December 2018 | 4.19.8 |
| 4.0 Alpha | 6 September 2018 | 4.18 |
| 3.0 RC1 | 19 July 2016 | 4.6.4 |
| 3.0 Beta 2 | 27 June 2016 | 4.6.2 |
| 3.0 Beta 1 | 6 April 2016 | —N/a |
| 3.0 Alpha | 24 April 2015 | 3.18.11 |
| 3.0 Pre-Alpha | 3 February 2015 | —N/a |
| 2014.0 RC1 | 18 April 2014 | 3.13.10 |
| 2014.0 Beta | 24 March 2014 | 3.13.6 |
| 2014.0 Alpha 2 | 28 February 2014 | 3.12.13 |
| 2014.0 Alpha | 31 January 2014 | 3.12.8 |

== Screenshots ==
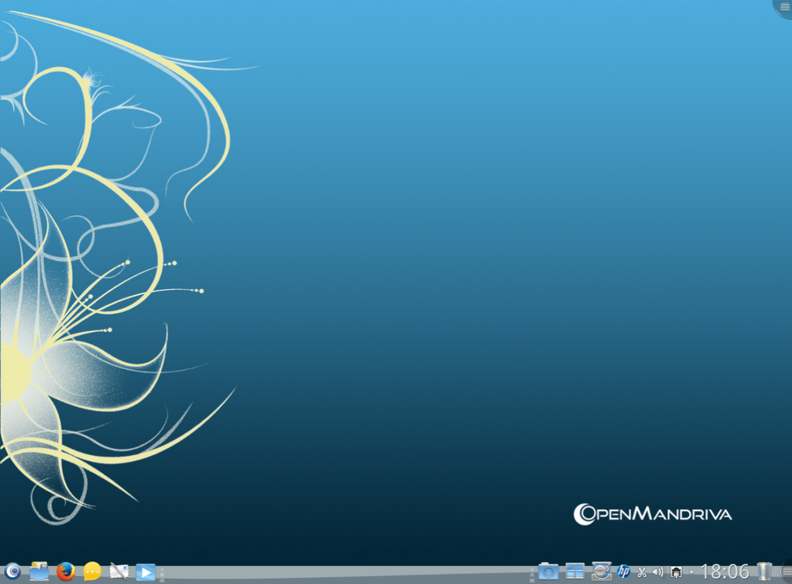
OpenMandriva Lx 2013.0

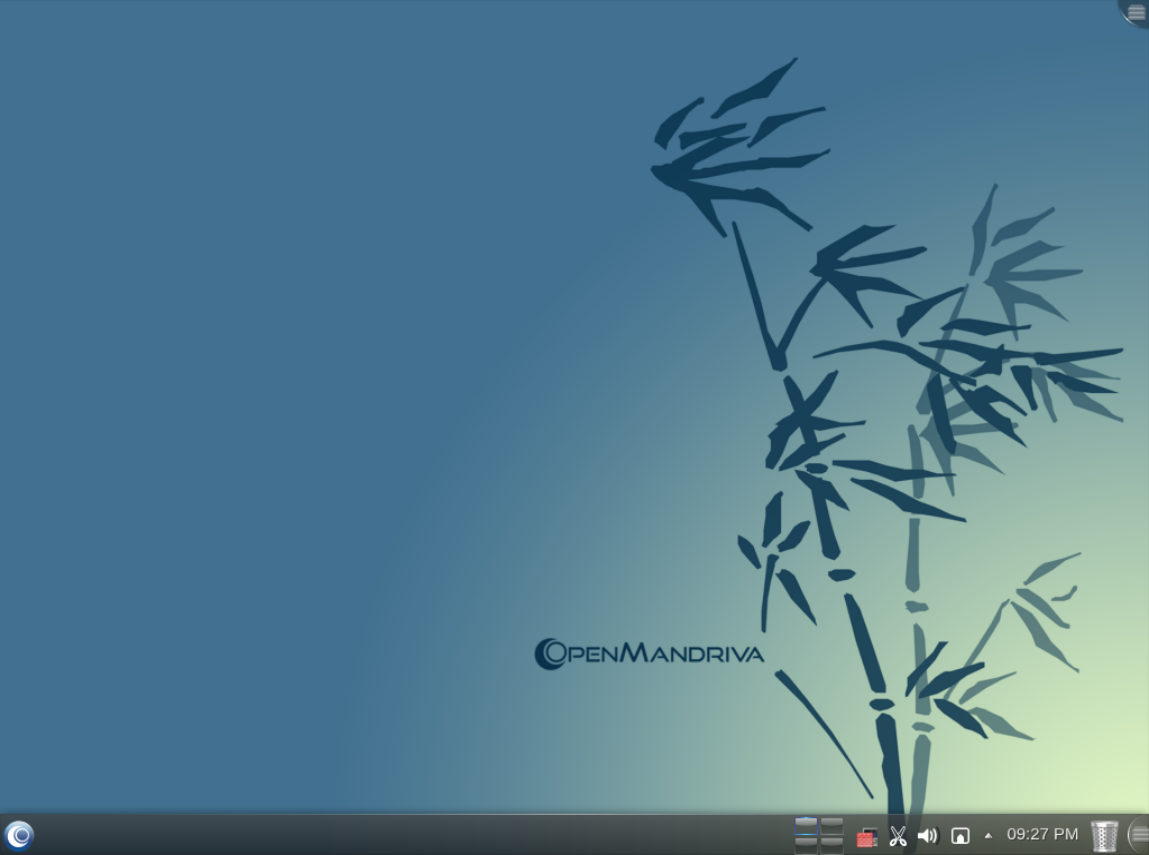
OpenMandriva Lx 2014.0

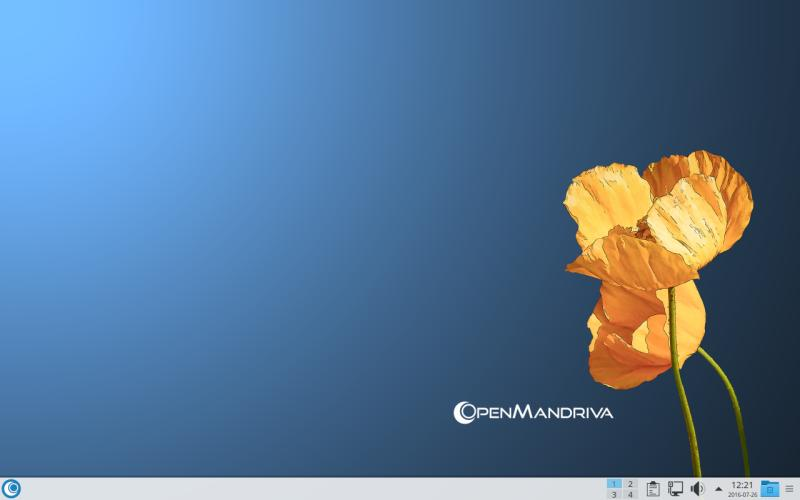
OpenMandriva Lx 3.0

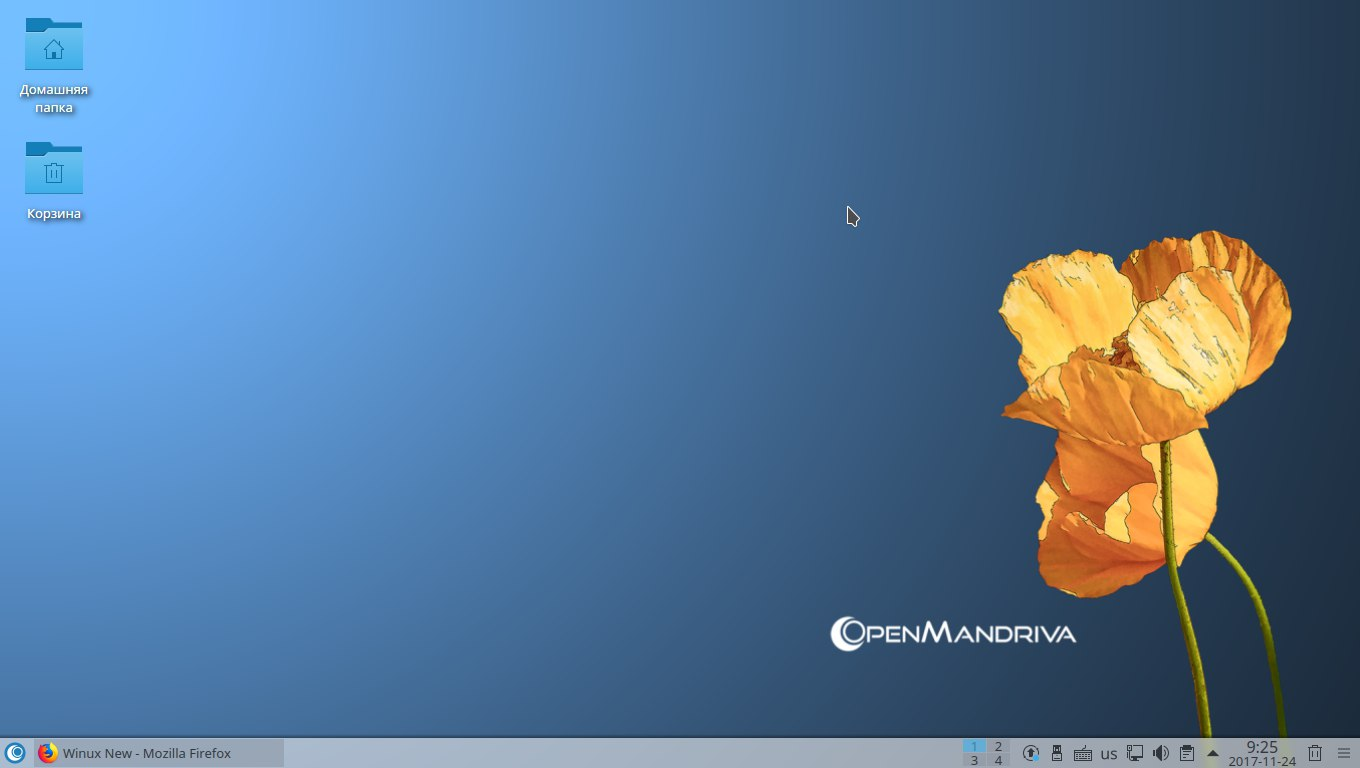
OpenMandriva Lx 3.03

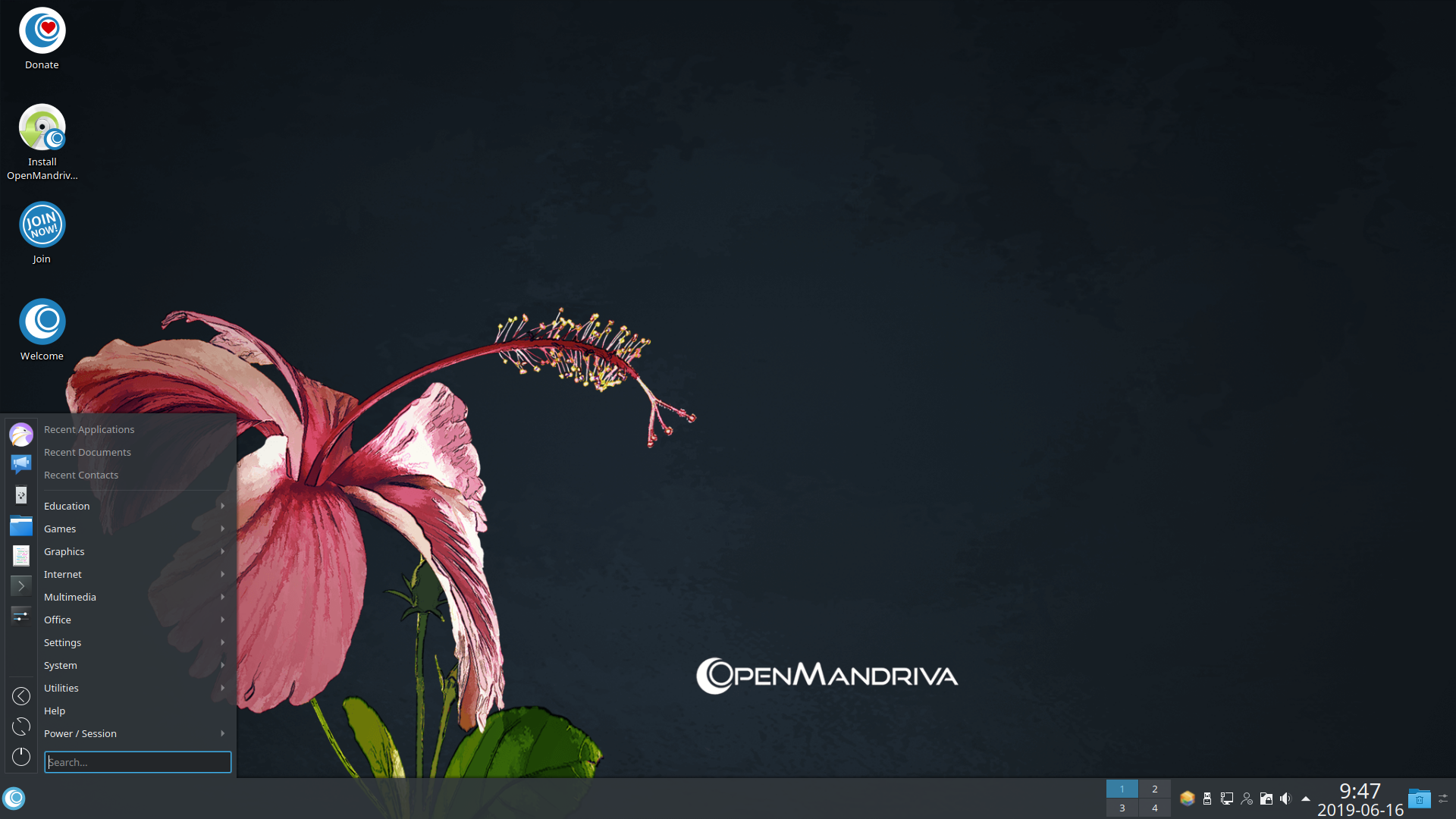
OpenMandriva Lx 4.0

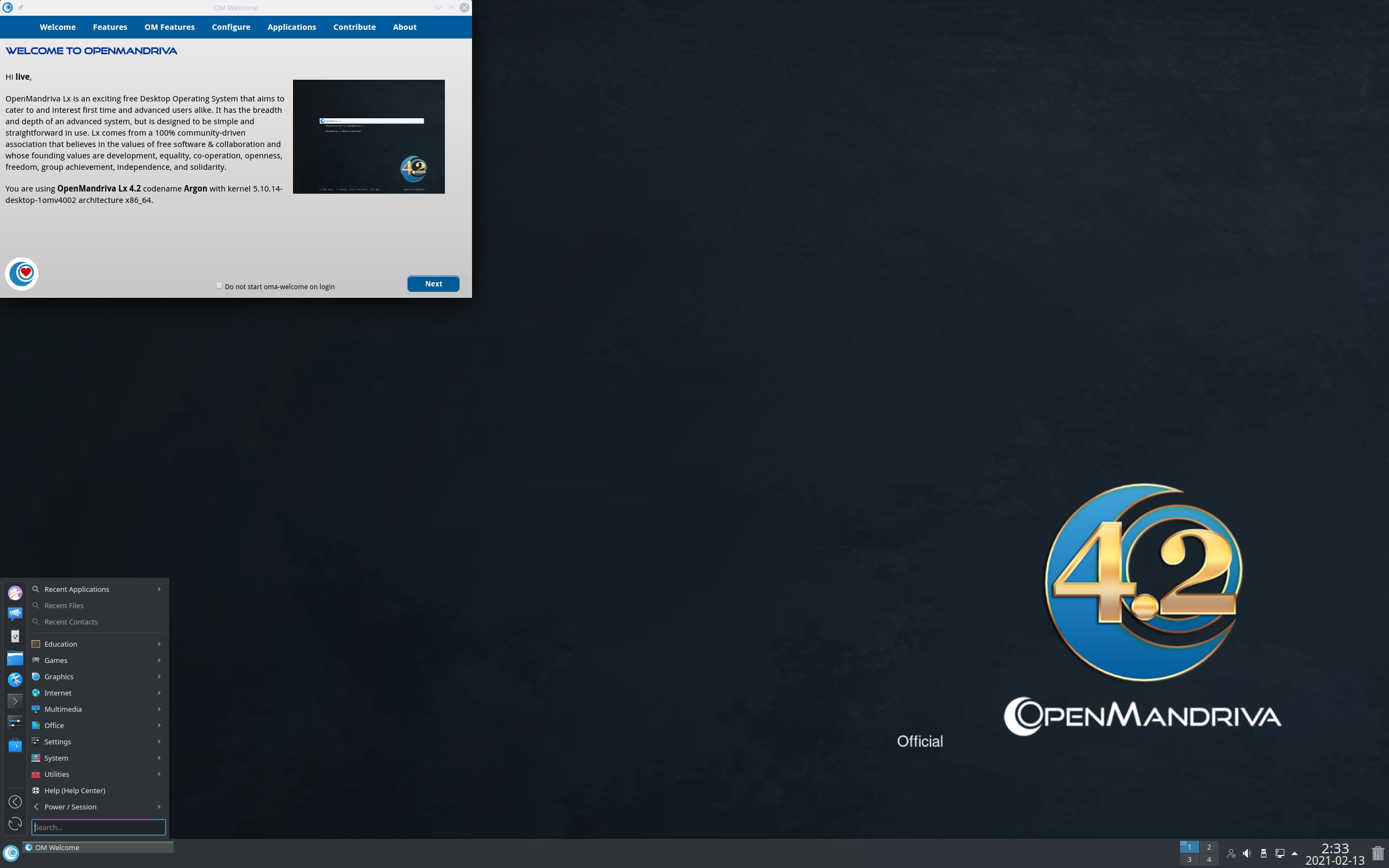
OpenMandriva Lx 4.2
