= Yum (software) =

Free and open-source command-line package management utility

YUM

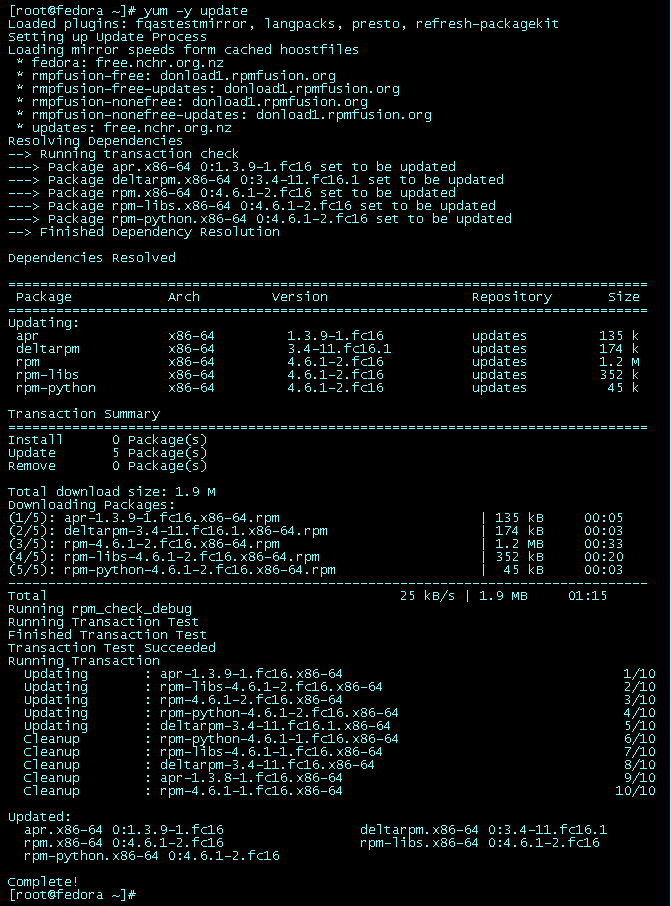
- YUM running an update on Fedora 16
- Developer: Seth Vidal
- Release: June 2002; 24 years ago
- Stable release: 3.4.3 / 28 June 2011; 15 years ago
- Written in: Python
- Operating system: Linux, AIX, IBM i, ArcaOS
- Platform: RPM
- Type: Package management system
- License: GPLv2
- Website: yum.baseurl.org
- Repository: yum.baseurl.org/gitweb/

The Yellowdog Updater Modified (YUM) is a free and open-source command-line package-management utility for computers running the Linux operating system using the RPM Package Manager. Though YUM has a command-line interface, several other tools provide graphical user interfaces to YUM functionality.

YUM allows for automatic updates and package and dependency management on RPM-based distributions. Like the Advanced Package Tool (APT) from Debian, YUM works with software repositories (collections of packages), which can be accessed locally or over a network connection.

Under the hood, YUM depends on RPM, which is a packaging standard for digital distribution of software, which automatically uses hashes and digital signatures to verify the authorship and integrity of said software; unlike some app stores, which serve a similar function, neither YUM nor RPM provide built-in support for proprietary restrictions on copying of packages by end-users. YUM is implemented as libraries in the Python programming language, with a small set of programs that provide a command-line interface. GUI-based wrappers such as YUM Extender (yumex) also exist, and has been adopted for Fedora Linux until version 22.

A rewrite of YUM named DNF replaced YUM as the default package manager in Fedora 22 (in 2015). This was required due to Fedora's transition from Python 2 to Python 3, which is not supported by YUM. DNF also improves on YUM in several ways - improved performance, better resolution of dependency conflicts, and easier integration with other software applications. From RHEL 8, yum is an alias for DNF.

== History ==
The original package manager, Yellowdog UPdater (YUP) was developed in 1999–2001 by Dan Burcaw, Bryan Stillwell, Stephen Edie, and Troy Bengegerdes at Terra Soft Solutions (under the leadership of then CEO Kai Staats) as a back-end engine for a graphical installer of Yellow Dog Linux.

As a full rewrite of YUP, YUM evolved primarily to update and manage Red Hat Linux systems used at the Duke University Department of Physics by Seth Vidal and Michael Stenner. Vidal continued to contribute to YUM until his death in a Durham, North Carolina bicycle accident on 8 July 2013.

In 2003 Robert G. Brown at Duke published documentation for YUM. Subsequent adopters included Fedora, Rocky Linux, AlmaLinux, CentOS, and many other RPM-based Linux distributions, including Yellow Dog Linux itself, where YUM replaced the original YUP utility — last updated on SourceForge in 2001. By 2005, it was estimated to be in use on over half of the Linux market, and by 2007 YUM was considered the "tool of choice" for RPM-based Linux distributions.

YUM aimed to address both the perceived deficiencies in the old APT-RPM, and restrictions of the Red Hat up2date package management tool. YUM superseded up2date in Red Hat Enterprise Linux 5 and later. Some authors refer to YUM as the Yellowdog Update Manager, or suggest that "Your Update Manager" would be more appropriate. A basic knowledge of YUM is often included as a requirement for Linux system-administrator certification. The GNU General Public License of YUM allows the free and open-source software to be freely distributed and modified without any royalty, if other terms of the license are honored.

While yum was originally created for Linux, it has been ported to a number of other operating systems including AIX, IBM i, and ArcaOS.

=== Transition to DNF ===
By the early 2010s, YUM faced structural architectural challenges. Key limitations included poor performance during metadata processing, high memory consumption, an undocumented Python API, and an inability to resolve complex dependency graphs efficiently without triggering software deadlocks. Furthermore, YUM's codebase was tightly coupled with Python 2, presenting a blocker for Linux distributions migrating toward Python 3 runtime environments.

To address these shortcomings, developers created **DNF** (Dandified YUM), a complete rewrite introduced as a fork of YUM 3.4. DNF replaced YUM's custom dependency solver with `libsolv`, a high-performance external SAT solver originally developed by openSUSE, significantly improving resolution speeds and memory management.

DNF officially replaced YUM as the default package manager in Fedora 22 (released in May 2015). In Red Hat Enterprise Linux 8 (released in 2019), DNF 4 became the underlying engine, with the yum binary maintained as a symlink to dnf for backward compatibility.

== Operations ==
=== Transaction management and history ===
Unlike previous-generation package management tools, YUM implements a transaction-tracking system via the yum history command (introduced in version 3.2.x). This mechanism records every modification made to the system state—including installations, updates, removals, and complete system upgrades—in a local database.

This architecture allows system administrators to inspect the chronological registry of changes, roll back a problematic transaction (rollback), or replay a sequence of operations (redo) across multiple nodes in a deterministic manner.

=== Package group abstraction ===
To simplify the deployment of complex environments, YUM introduced the concept of "package groups" (yum group). Instead of individually selecting every software dependency, repository metadata defines coherent sets of software (such as desktop environments like GNOME, or web application stacks like LAMP servers). Inspection commands (group list, group info) and installation commands (group install) allow administrators to manage these meta-packages at the system-wide level.

=== Cache management and performance ===
To optimize network performance and enable partial offline use, YUM locally stores all downloaded XML/SQLite metadata alongside retrieved RPM files within a caching directory (/var/cache/yum/). The yum clean subcommand allows selective purging of this cache (targeting headers, metadata, or obsolete packages) to resolve dependency inconsistencies or curb disk space consumption.

== Extensions ==
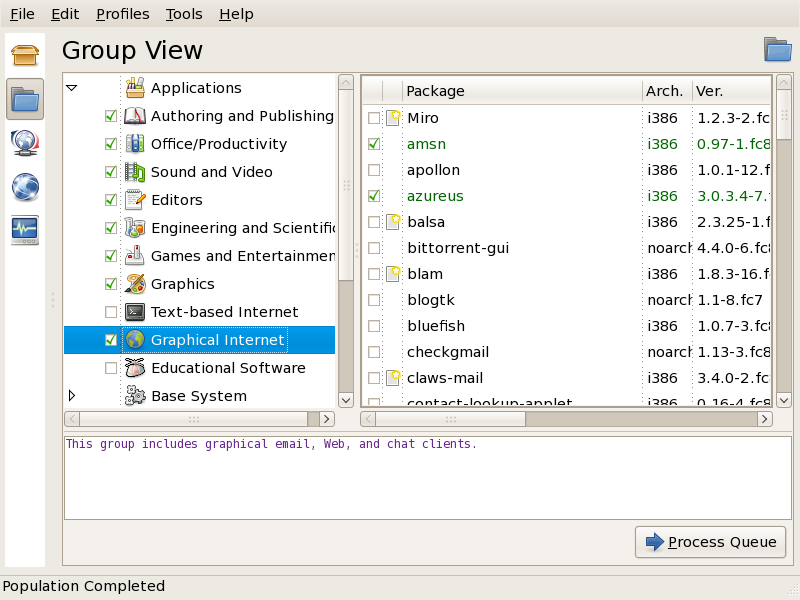
Screenshot of Yum Extender (yumex)

The 2.x versions of YUM feature an additional interface for programming extensions in Python that allows the behavior of YUM to be altered. Certain plug-ins are installed by default. A commonly installed package yum-utils, contains commands which use the YUM API, and many plugins.

Graphical user interfaces, known as "front-ends", allow easier use of YUM. PackageKit and Yum Extender (yumex) are two examples. Yum Extender was deprecated for a while when Fedora migrated to DNF, but it was rewritten in Python 3 and Gtk 3 and has been in progress for development. This brand-new Yum Extender is available for Fedora 34 or newer.

== Metadata ==
Information about packages (as opposed to the packages themselves) is known as metadata. These metadata are combined with information in each package to determine (and resolve, if possible) dependencies among the packages. The hope is to avoid a situation known as dependency hell. A separate tool, createrepo, sets up YUM software repositories, generating the necessary metadata in a standard XML format (and the SQLite metadata if given the -d option). The mrepo tool (formerly known as Yam) can help in the creation and maintenance of repositories.

YUM's XML repository, built with input from many other developers, quickly became the standard for RPM-based repositories. Besides the distributions that use YUM directly, SUSE Linux 10.1 added support for YUM repositories in YaST, and the Open Build Service repositories use the YUM XML repository format metadata.

YUM automatically synchronizes the remote meta data to the local client, with other tools opting to synchronize only when requested by the user. Having automatic synchronization means that YUM cannot fail due to the user failing to run a command at the correct interval.

=== Repositories and configuration variables ===
YUM operates on a modular configuration model located within the /etc/yum.repos.d/ directory. Each `.repo` formatted file defines access parameters for remote or local software repositories (source URLs, GPG signature verification keys, and repository enablement status).

YUM incorporates a dynamic variable interpolation mechanism within configuration files, allowing queries to automatically adapt to the specific characteristics of the host system:

- $releasever: substituted by the major or minor release version of the installed Linux distribution;
- $basearch: substituted by the hardware architecture of the processor (e.g., x86_64, aarch64).

This abstraction facilitates centralized maintenance of configuration files across heterogeneous fleets without requiring manual URL adjustments for each hardware architecture.

== See also ==
- DNF - a rewrite of YUM based on libsolv
- urpmi - another cli-frontend for rpm
- APT-RPM - another rpm frontend, derived from APT, cli-frontend for dpkg.
- List of Linux package management systems
