= ALT Linux =

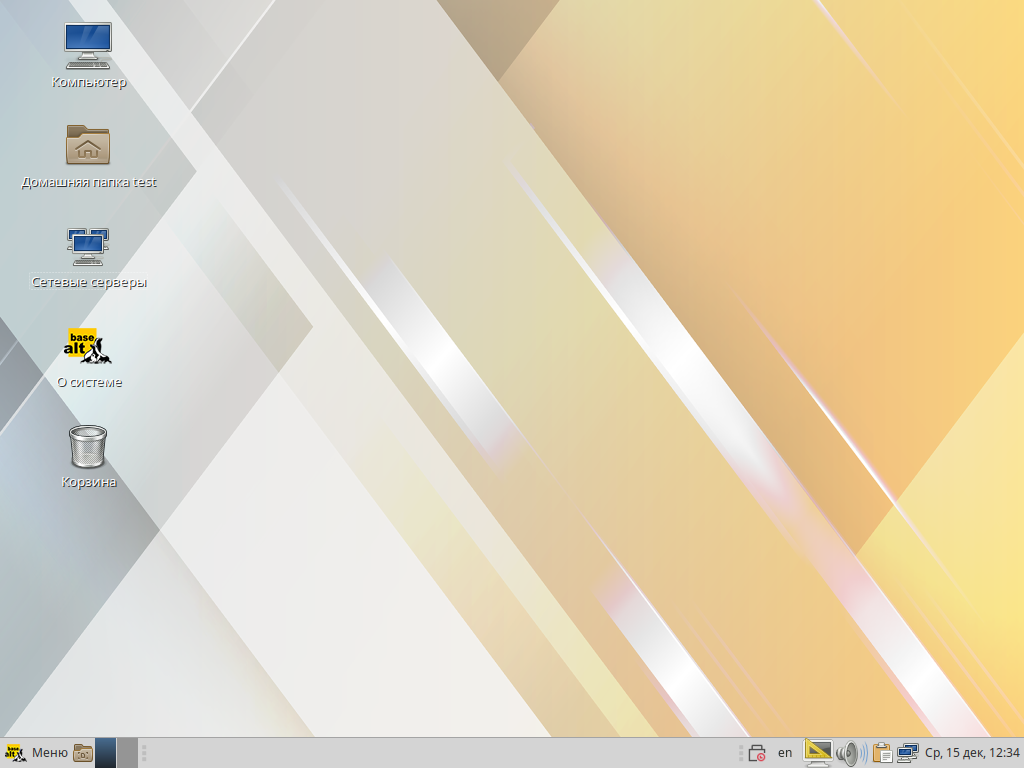
- ALT Workstation 10
- Developer: ALT Linux Ltd and ALT Linux Team
- OS family: Linux (Unix-like)
- Working state: Active
- Source model: Open source
- Initial release: March 2001; 25 years ago
- Latest release: 11.1 / 3 September 2025; 14 months ago
- Latest preview: Sisyphus / released daily
- Available in: Multilingual (but installation process in Russian by default; can edit the language at boot of livecd by changing ru_RU to en_US)
- Update method: 0.5 years per stabilization
- Package manager: APT-RPM
- Supported platforms: AMD64, i586, ARMv7, e2k, AArch64
- Kernel type: Monolithic (Linux kernel)
- Default user interface: bash; KDE Plasma Desktop (in Desktop), Xfce (in Desktop Lite)
- Official website: en.altlinux.org English altlinux.org Russian

ALT Linux is a set of Russian operating systems based on RPM Package Manager (RPM) and built on a Linux kernel and Sisyphus package repository. ALT Linux has been developed collectively by ALT Linux Team developers community and ALT Linux Ltd.

== History ==
ALT Linux Team arose from the merger of IPLabs Linux Team and the Linux community of the Institute of Logic, Cognitive Science and Development of Personality. The latter cooperated with Mandrake Linux and SUSE Linux teams to improve localization (specifically Cyrillic script), producing a Linux-Mandrake Russian Edition (RE).

Mandrake and Mandrake RE became different distributions and thus the decision was made to create a separate project. The name ALT was coined, which is a recursive acronym meaning ALT Linux Team.

The split led to the creation of the Sisyphus package repository, which is an unstable branch of the ALT Linux development. In 2007, the Sisyphus repository won a prestigious CNews award in nomination for Information Security.

- Red Hat Linux
- - DemoLinux
  - - ALT Linux
    - - - TinyMe
        - - Granular Linux
          - - Phinx
            - PCLinuxOS
      - - SAM Linux → SAMity Linux
        - - BlackPanther OS
          - - OpenSLS → Annvix
            - - Unity Linux
              - - Mageia
                - - - OpenMandriva Lx
                    - Mandrake Linux → Mandriva
                  - ROSA Linux

== Releases ==
=== Version history ===
Version	Release date	End-of-life date	Kernel version
1.1	2001-09-12	?	2.4.9
2.0	2002-04-17	?	2.4.18
2.2	2003-03-04	?	2.4.20
2.3	2004-03-25	?	2.4.22
2.4	2004-09-19	?	2.4.26
3.0	2005-12-08	?	2.6.12
4.0	2007-08-27	?	2.6.18
4.1.1	2009-01-14	?	2.6.25
5.0.0	2009-10-29	?	2.6.30
6.0.0	2011-08-30	?	3.0.3
7.0.0	2013-07-01	?	3.8.13
8.0	2016-08-16	?	4.4.16
8.1	2016-11-24	?	4.4.34
8.2	2017-12-31	?	4.9.72
8.2.1	2019-09-06	?	4.19.65
9.0	2019-10-28	?	4.19.79
9.1	2020-08-02	?	5.4.51
10.0	2021-12-16	?	5.15.34
10.1	2022-11-16	?	5.15.72
10.2	2024-03-16	?	6.1.79
Legend: Unsupported Supported Latest version

=== Linux-Mandrake ===
Linux-Mandrake 7.0 Russian Edition, released in the beginning of 2000, was the first de facto independent distribution of IPLabs Linux Team. It kept the name Mandrake with permission from Mandrake developers.

Spring 2001 was the second IPLabs Linux team release, released several months later.

=== ALT Linux 1.0 ===
Since the summer of 2001, ALT Linux Team has been formed and the ALT Linux name has been established.

The first ALT Linux release was ALT Linux Junior 1.0, released in summer of 2001, followed by the updated ALT Linux Junior 1.1 in autumn of 2001.

Junior distributions were 1CD releases.

=== ALT Linux 2.* ===
ALT Linux Master 2.0, released in May 2002, was the 4CD all-purpose Linux distribution targeted for software developers and system administrators.

ALT Linux Junior 2.0 was released in summer of 2002, as a 1CD desktop/workstation-oriented release.

=== ALT Linux 3.0 ===
ALT Linux Compact 3.0 was released during autumn 2005, and consisted of 1CD/1DVD installable versions along with LiveCD (TravelCD 3.0). There were several subsequent OEM updates counting up to 3.0.5.

=== ALT Linux 4.0 ===
These series changed the official naming somewhat to be ALT Linux 4.0 $flavour.

- Server was released in June 2007 (1CD+1DVD per platform; i586 and x86_64);
- Office Server quickly followed (1CD; i586 and x86_64);
- Desktop Personal in August 2007 (1DVD, LiveCD, Rescue CD; i586; KDE3);
- Lite in December 2007 (installation CD, live CD and 2CD with addons; i586; Xfce4);
- Terminal in December 2007 (joint release with Media Magic Ltd, 1DVD; i586; KDE3, low client RAM requirements).

There was also a more conservative school 4.0 branch maintained for the Russian schools pilot project, and several distributions specifically tailored for schools released using that as a base.

=== ALT Linux 4.1 ===
- Desktop was released in October 2008 (1CD/1DVD; i586 and x86_64; KDE3);
- Children in December 2008 (LiveCD; i586);
- Skif in December 2008 (1CD; x86_64; HPC);
- School Server in February 2009 (1CD; i586).

=== ALT Linux 5.x ===
The 5.0 branch was canceled mainly due to stormy X.org conditions (and subsequently archived); 5.1 community branch was created along with p5 conservative branch later in 2009. Somewhat confusingly, distributions based on the p5/branch were numbered as ALT Linux 5.0:

- Ark (client+server suite, 1DVD+1CD per platform; i586 and x86_64);
- School Suite – mostly i586, also including docs, video lessons and free software for Windows (3DVD):
  - Server (1DVD; i586 and x86_64);
  - Terminal (1DVD; KDE3);
  - Master (1DVD/flash; KDE4);
  - Junior (1DVD/flash; GNOME2);
  - Lite (2CD; Xfce4);
  - New Lite (1CD/1DVD/flash; LXDE);
- KDesktop (1DVD; i586 and x86_64; KDE4);
- Simply Linux 5.0 (1CD/flash/LiveCD; i586; Xfce4).

=== Lite ===
A small single-CD distribution for older/low-memory computers, with Xfce as default desktop. Available in normal and Live CD versions. Rather superseded by LXDE-based New Lite.

=== Compact ===
Compact is a series of ALT Linux distributions tailored for beginner users. It is mostly used on workstations, home computers, and notebooks. It includes additional means for easy configuration, many office and multimedia applications, and some games. Compact was also a popular choice for OEM white-labeling, i.e., creating a specific edition for various hardware vendors to bundle with their hardware.

Linux ALT Linux Server is a hardened server single CD distribution. It is certified by Federal department of technical and expert control of Russia in the following categories:

- by the level of monitoring for non-declared features – level 4
- class of protection from unauthorized access to information – class 5

=== Terminal ===
ALT Linux Terminal is a terminal server distribution based on ALT Linux Desktop and ALTSP5: a friendly/merging fork of Linux Terminal Server Project (LTSP) which is usable on older hardware acting as thin and diskless clients (16 MB RAM is enough, while stock LTSP5 usually requires ≥ 64 MB RAM). It was also adapted for Russian School Education National Project free software package.

=== Starterkits ===
The ALT Linux project also provides Starterkit editions with a range of desktop environments and window managers. In 2019, these included Cinnamon, GNOME, MATE, Xfce, LXDE, LXQt, Enlightenment, IceWM, Window Maker, and Trinity.
