= APT-RPM =

Linux package management tool

- Original author: Alfredo Kojima
- Developer: Panu Matilainen
- Stable release: 0.5.15lorg3.2 / June 22, 2006; 20 years ago
- Preview release: 0.5.15lorg3.94a / January 12, 2008; 18 years ago
- Written in: C, C++ and Python
- Operating system: Linux
- Type: Package manager
- Website: www.apt-rpm.org (defunct)
- Repository: apt-rpm.org/scm/apt.git

APT-RPM is a version of the Advanced Packaging Tool modified to work with the RPM Package Manager. It was originally ported to RPM by Alfredo Kojima and then further developed and improved by Gustavo Niemeyer, both working for the Conectiva Linux distribution at the time.

In March 2005, the maintainer of the program, Gustavo Niemeyer, announced that he would not continue developing it and that he would instead focus on Smart Package Manager, which was planned as a successor to APT-RPM.

In March 2006, development was picked up again by Panu Matilainen from Red Hat at a new home, introducing basic multilib functionality and support for common repository metadata.

== Distributions ==
Some distributions using APT-RPM for package management are:

- ALT Linux: APT-RPM is the main, officially supported way to upgrade packages from the ALT Linux repositories in ALT Linux distributions since 2001.
- PCLinuxOS: APT-RPM is the backend for the only official way to upgrade packages in this distribution.
- Vine Linux: APT-RPM has been the main, officially supported way to upgrade packages in Vine Linux distributions since 2001.

== See also ==
- Package manager
- Advanced Packaging Tool
