= Lycoris (company) =

American software company

Lycoris (formerly Redmond Linux Corporation) was an American independent software distributor headquartered in Maple Valley, Washington.

== Background ==
The company was founded in 2000 as Redmond Linux by Joseph Cheek, an entrepreneur who had previously worked for Linuxcare, with the intent to make free software easy enough for anyone to use. In late 2001, it merged with embedded systems company DeepLinux to become Redmond Linux Corporation. The company's first product was Redmond Linux Personal, a modified version of Linux.

The company was renamed to Lycoris in January 2002 and its assets were acquired by Mandriva on June 15, 2005. Jason Spisak was part of its staff.

== Lycoris Desktop/LX ==
As Lycoris, the company's flagship product was Lycoris Desktop/LX, a Linux distribution. The distribution's installer was originally based on Caldera International's OpenLinux Workstation 3.1 distribution with the rest of the distribution built from the kernel up. The desktop and applications shared a high similarity to Microsoft's Windows XP, including the background image that was shipped with the software.
