= ROSA Linux =

Software distribution

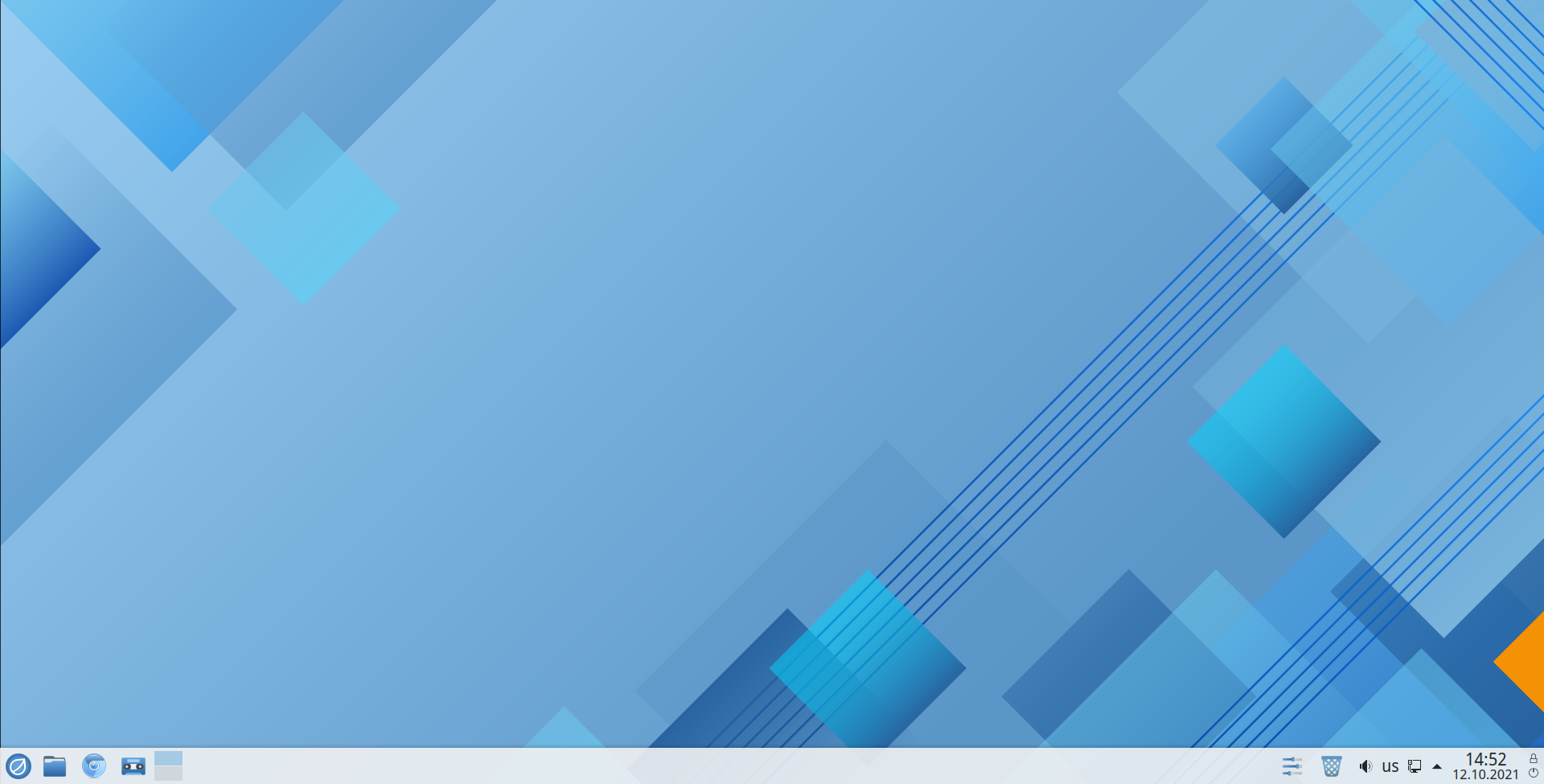
- Rosa Fresh 12 (KDE Plasma 5)
- Developer: AO NTC IT ROSA
- OS family: Linux (Unix-like)
- Working state: Current
- Source model: Open source
- Initial release: 1 December 2010; 15 years ago
- Latest release: 13.2 / 1 April 2026; 6 months ago
- Repository: mirror.rosalab.ru/rosa/rosa2021.1/repository/SRPMS/
- Available in: Russian; English; French; German; Spanish; Italian; Portuguese
- Package manager: RPM & DNF
- Supported platforms: P5 (i586), AMD64
- Kernel type: Monolithic (Linux)
- Userland: GNU Core Utilities
- Default user interface: KDE Plasma 6, GNOME, LXQt, Xfce
- License: Mainly GPL and other free software licenses, minor additions of proprietary
- Official website: www.rosa.ru

ROSA Linux is a Linux operating system distribution, developed by the Russian company 'AO NTC IT ROSA' (Russian: АО «НТЦ ИТ РОСА»). It is available in three different editions: ROSA Desktop Fresh, ROSA Enterprise Desktop, and ROSA Enterprise Linux Server, with the latter two aiming at commercial users. Its desktop computer editions come bundled with closed-source software such as Adobe Flash Player, multimedia codecs, NVIDIA drivers, and Steam.

ROSA Desktop Fresh 13.0, the latest desktop version, was released on 28 February 2025, and is available with four different desktop environments: KDE Plasma 6, GNOME, LXQt and Xfce. It also contains open source software developed in-house by ROSA, such as ROSA Image Writer or ROSA Media Player. ROSA Linux has been certified by the Ministry of Defence of Russia.

Although its main popularity is in the Russian language market, ROSA Desktop also received favorable reviews by several non-Russian online publications. German technology website Golem.de praised ROSA for its stability and hardware support, while LinuxInsider.com called ROSA "a real Powerhouse".

== History ==
ROSA originated as a fork of now defunct French distribution Mandriva Linux and has since been developed independently. The ROSA company was founded in early 2010 and released the first version of its operating system in December 2010. It initially targeted enterprise users only, but in late 2012, ROSA started its end-user oriented distribution, Desktop Fresh. Before its bankruptcy, Mandriva developed its last releases jointly with ROSA. Mandriva 2011 was also based on ROSA. Also MagOS Linux, is based on ROSA.

- Red Hat Linux
- - DemoLinux
  - - ALT Linux
    - - - TinyMe
        - - Granular Linux
          - - Phinx
            - PCLinuxOS
      - - SAM Linux → SAMity Linux
        - - BlackPanther OS
          - - OpenSLS → Annvix
            - - Unity Linux
              - - Mageia
                - - - OpenMandriva Lx
                    - Mandrake Linux → Mandriva
                  - ROSA

== Version history ==
=== ROSA ===
Version	Desktop environment	Release date	Linux kernel
2011 "Hydrogen"	KDE	29 August 2011	—N/a
2012 LTS "Marathon"	KDE	13 May 2012	—N/a
Desktop.Fresh 2012	KDE	19 December 2012	—N/a
Desktop Fresh R1	KDE	17 July 2013	—N/a
Desktop Fresh R2	KDE	4 December 2013	—N/a
Desktop Fresh R3	KDE, GNOME	29 April 2014	3.10.34
Desktop Fresh R4	KDE, LXDE	8 October 2014	3.14.15
Desktop Fresh R5	KDE, LXDE, GNOME	25 December 2014	3.14.25
Desktop Fresh R6	KDE	15 July 2015	3.14.44
Desktop Fresh R7	KDE 4, KDE 5, LXQt	5 January 2016	4.1.15
Desktop Fresh R8	KDE 4, KDE 5, GNOME 3, MATE	2 August 2016	4.1.25
Desktop Fresh R8.1	KDE 4	22 February 2017	4.9 LTS
Desktop Fresh R9	KDE 4, KDE 5, GNOME 3, LXQt	1st half of 2017	4.9.20 LTS
Desktop Fresh R10	KDE Plasma 5, KDE Plasma 4, LXQt	4 December 2017	4.9
Desktop Fresh R11	KDE Plasma 5, KDE Plasma 4, Xfce, LXQt	15 March 2019	4.15
Desktop Fresh R11.1	KDE Plasma 5, KDE Plasma 4, Xfce, LXQt	23 April 2020	5.4.32
Fresh 12	KDE Plasma 5	12 October 2021	5.10.71
Fresh 12.1	KDE Plasma 5, GNOME 41	12 November 2021	5.10.74
Fresh 12.2	KDE Plasma 5, GNOME 41, LXQt	14 February 2022	5.10.74
Fresh 12.3	KDE Plasma 5, GNOME 42, LXQt, Xfce	31 October 2022	5.15.75
Fresh 12.4	KDE Plasma 5, GNOME, LXQt, Xfce	4 April 2023	6.1.20 LTS
Fresh 12.5	KDE Plasma 5, GNOME, LXQt, Xfce	2 April 2024	6.6.47
Fresh 13	KDE Plasma 6, GNOME	28 February 2024	6.12.13

=== ROSA Chrome ===
Version	Desktop environment	Release date	Linux kernel
12.4	KDE Plasma 5	26 April 2023	6.1
12.5	KDE Plasma 5	30 May 2024	6.6
12.6		6 November 2024	

=== ROSA Mobile ===
Version	Supported models	Release date
1.0	R-FON	11 September 2023
2.0	R-FON	14 March 2025
3.0	R-FON	27 April 2026

== Reception ==
LinuxBSDos.com reviewed ROSA Desktop Fresh R2 with GNOME. He wrote:

ROSA Desktop Fresh is supposed to be the line that ships with the latest and greatest (read: bleeding edge software versions), but ROSA Desktop Fresh R2 GNOME did not live up to that billing. Instead of GNOME 3.10, the latest stable version of the GNOME 3 desktop, you get GNOME 3.8.4.

LinuxBSDos.com also reviewed same version with KDE, and have the review about earlier version — Fresh and Marathon 2012.

In October 2012, Dedoimedo wrote review about ROSA Marathon 2012:

ROSA is a fairly elegant distribution, with a simple, clean layout, a handful of posh icons, windows-like decorations, and a classy menu. All in all, you would be tempted to guess what desktop environment you're working in, as the customized KDE leans toward more Gnome-like features.

Dedoimedo also wrote review about ROSA Desktop Fresh R7.

Jesse Smith reviewed ROSA Desktop Fresh 2012 R1 for DistroWatch Weekly:

Booting from the disc brings up a menu asking if we would like to launch the ROSA live environment or run the distribution's system installer. There is a third option which is to boot from the local hard drive and I was surprised to find booting from the local drive is the default option. This makes a good deal of sense as it means if we install the distribution and forget to eject the disc (or USB thumb drive) that we will still boot into the local installation of ROSA. Opting to run the live desktop brings us to a series of screens asking us to read the distribution's license agreement, set our time zone, and confirm our keyboard's layout. From there we are brought to the KDE desktop. The theme is bright and the background is a nice, light blue. At the bottom of the display, we find the application menu, some quick-launch icons, and the task switcher. One of the first things I did was seek out the system installer and attempt to launch it. When I clicked on the system installer icon a pop-up appeared which simply said: "password invalid" and the installer closed. Given this reception, I decided to reboot the machine and try running the system installer from the live disc's boot menu.

Smith also reviewed Fresh R9 version.
