= Delta ISO =

Mechanism to update ISO image

A delta ISO is used to update an existing ISO image which contains RPM Package Manager (RPM) files. It utilizes DeltaRPMs, a form of delta compression, for RPMs which have changed between the old and new versions of the ISO. Delta ISOs help save disk space and reduce download times, as they include only the files that have been updated in the new version of the ISO, a user can apply it to update the outdated ISO. This technique is used by some RPM-based Linux distributions, such as Fedora and openSUSE.
