= Up2date =

Linux package management tool

up2date
- Written in: Python
- Operating system: Linux
- License: GNU General Public License

up2date, also known as the Red Hat Update Agent, is a tool used by older versions of Red Hat Enterprise Linux, CentOS and Fedora Core that downloads and installs new software and upgrades the operating system. It functions as a front-end to the RPM Package Manager and adds advanced features such as automatic dependency resolution. The file /etc/sysconfig/rhn/sources specifies where up2date will search for packages.

== Tool ==
By default, Red Hat Enterprise Linux's up2date retrieves packages from a Red Hat Network (RHN) server, though users can add directories full of packages or even Debian and yum repositories if they wish.

up2date on Fedora Core defaults to retrieving packages from yum repositories. Again, other sources can be added (apart from RHN, which is Red Hat Enterprise Linux Specific). As of Fedora Core 5 and Red Hat Enterprise Linux 5, up2date is no longer shipped with the distribution; yum is used instead.

CentOS's up2date downloads packages from yum repositories on the CentOS Mirror Network.

== See also ==
- Package management system
