= Gaël Duval =

French software developer and entrepreneur

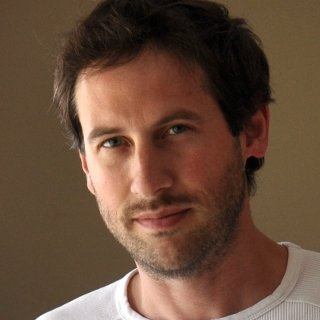
- Gaël Duval in 2016
- Born: Gaël Duval; 1973 (age 52–53); Caen, Normandy, France
- Years active: 1998 to present
- Known for: creator of Mandrake Linux, which became Mandriva Linux (discontinued), and co-founder of MandrakeSoft, which became Mandriva (discontinued); creator of /e/
- Website: www.indidea.org/gael/blog/

Gaël Duval (French pronunciation: [ɡaɛl dyval]; born 1973) is a French entrepreneur. In July 1998, he created Mandrake Linux (which became Mandriva Linux, now discontinued), a Linux distribution originally based on Red Hat Linux and KDE. He was also a co-founder of MandrakeSoft (which merged in Mandriva, now discontinued) with Jacques Le Marois and Frédéric Bastok.

Gaël Duval was responsible for communication in the Mandriva management team until he was laid off by the company in March 2006, in a round of cost-cutting. Duval suspected part of the reason for his dismissal was disagreement with management over the company's future strategy, resulting in a lawsuit against the company.

As of 2006, Duval is chairman and Chief Technology Officer at Ulteo. The company was bought by AZNetwork group in 2015.

In 2016, he co-founded NFactory.io, an incubator-accelerator of "startups".

In November 2017, Gael Duval created the /e/ mobile operating system, which is a privacy-oriented fork of the Android-based LineageOS accompanied with a set of online services. In 2018, Duval founded the E Foundation, which maintains /e/, and ECORP SAS (now Murena), a privately held corporation, which operates their online sales and services sites.

== Education ==
Duval is a graduate of the University of Caen Normandy in France, where he studied networks and documentary applications.
