= Mageia =

Unix-like operating system forked from Mandriva Linux

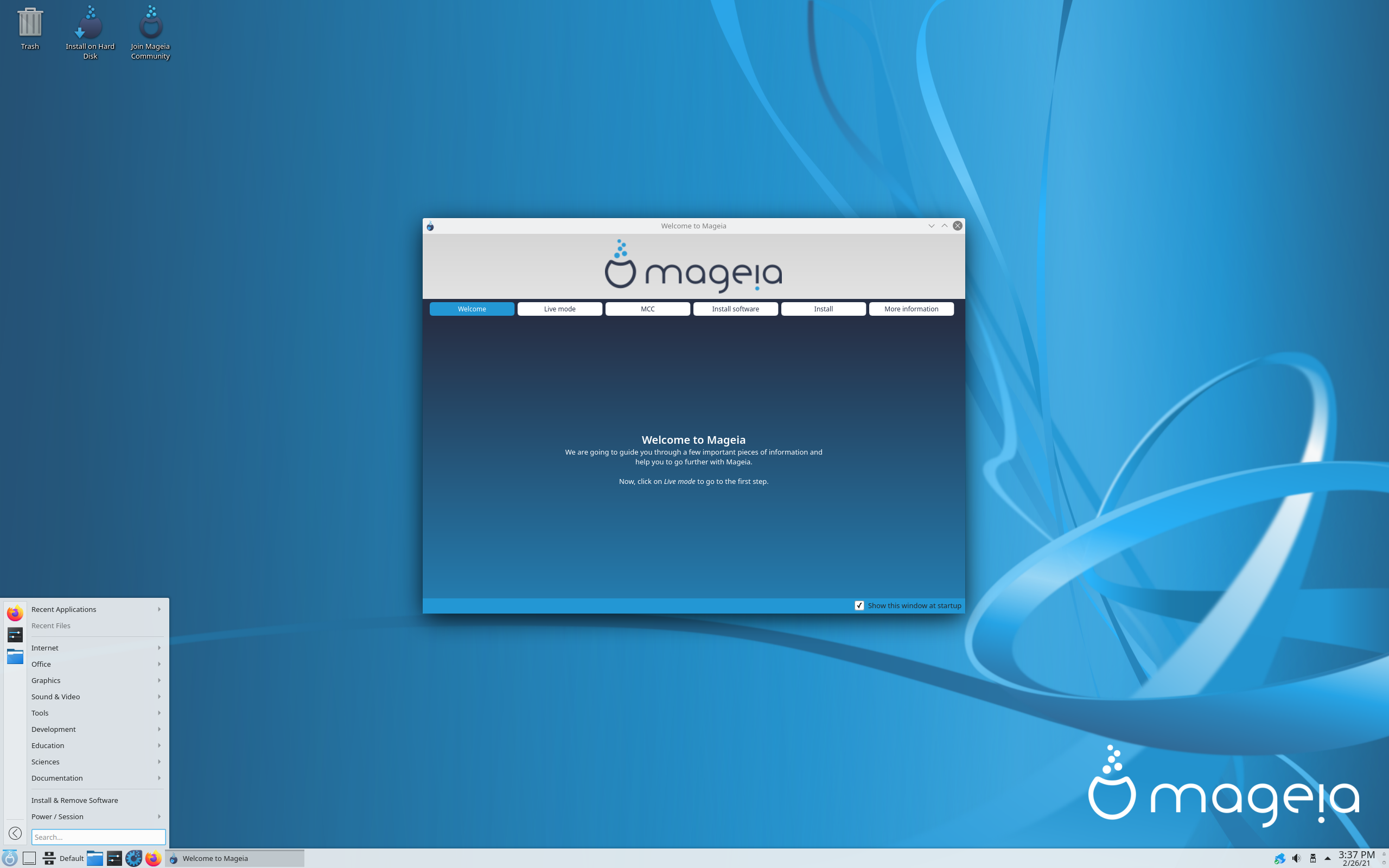
- Screenshot of Mageia 8 KDE
- OS family: Unix-like (Linux kernel)
- Working state: Active
- Source model: Open source
- Initial release: June 1, 2011; 15 years ago
- Latest release: 10 / 28 June 2026; 4 months ago
- Latest preview: 10 alpha / January 10, 2026; 10 months ago
- Available in: 167 languages
- Package manager: DNF (alternate) and urpmi (legacy)
- Supported platforms: i586, x86, AMD64, ARM64
- Kernel type: Monolithic (Linux)
- Userland: GNU
- Default user interface: KDE Plasma Desktop (Live USB/DVD), GNOME 3 Desktop (Live USB/DVD), XFCE (Live USB/DVD)LXDE, LXQt, Cinnamon, MATE, Enlightenment
- License: Free software licenses (mainly GPL) and other licenses
- Preceded by: Mandriva Linux
- Official website: www.mageia.org/en

Mageia is a Linux-based operating system, distributed as free and open-source software. It was forked from the Mandriva Linux distribution. The name comes from the Greek μαγεία (mageia, lit. 'magic' or 'sorcery').

The first release of the software distribution, Mageia 1, took place in June 2011.

== History ==
Mageia was created in 2010 as a fork of Mandriva Linux, by a group of former employees of Mandriva S.A. and several other members of the Mandriva community.

On September 2, 2010, Edge IT, one of the subsidiaries of Mandriva, was placed under liquidation process by the Tribunal de commerce in Paris; effective September 17, all assets were liquidated and employees were let go.

The next day, on September 18, 2010, some of these former employees, who were mostly responsible for the development and maintenance of the Mandriva Linux distribution, and several community members announced the creation of Mageia, with the support of many members of the community of developers, users and employees of Mandriva Linux.

- Red Hat Linux
- - DemoLinux
  - - ALT Linux
    - - - TinyMe
        - - Granular Linux
          - - Phinx
            - PCLinuxOS
      - - SAM Linux → SAMity Linux
        - - BlackPanther OS
          - - OpenSLS → Annvix
            - - Unity Linux
              - - Mageia
                - - - OpenMandriva Lx
                    - Mandrake Linux → Mandriva
                  - ROSA Linux

== Desktop environments ==
Mageia can use all major desktop environments. As was the case with Mandrake and Mandriva Linux, KDE Plasma is the main and most used environment. End-users can choose from Plasma and GNOME 64-bit live DVD editions, 32-bit and 64-bit Xfce live DVD editions, and any environment in the full DVD installation edition.

It uses Mageia Control Center. LXDE, LXQt, Cinnamon, MATE and Enlightenment are also available.

== Application repository ==
Mageia offers a very large repository of software, such as productivity applications and a large variety of games. It was the first Linux distribution in which MariaDB replaced Oracle's MySQL.

== Development ==
Mageia was originally planned to be released on a nine-month release cycle, with each release to be supported for 18 months.

Actual practice has been to release a new version when the Mageia development community feels the new release is ready from quality and stability viewpoints.

The latest stable version is Mageia 10, released on 28 June 2026.

=== Version history ===
Version	Release date	End-of-life date	Kernel version
1	2011-06-01	2012-12-01	2.6.38.7
2	2012-05-22	2013-11-22	3.3.6
3	2013-05-19	2014-11-26	3.8.13
4	2014-02-01	2015-09-19	3.12.13
4.1	2014-06-20	2015-09-19	3.12.21
5	2015-06-19	2017-12-31	3.19.8
5.1	2016-12-02	2017-12-31	4.4.30
6	2017-07-16	2019-09-30	4.9.35
6.1	2018-10-05	2019-09-30	4.14.70
7.0	2019-07-01	2021-06-30	5.1.14
7.1	2019-07-16	2021-06-30	5.1.14
8	2021-02-26	2023-11-30	5.10.16
9	2023-08-27	2026-09-28	6.4
10	2026-06-28	2028-03-31	6.18
Legend: Old version, not maintained Older version, still maintained Current stable version Future version

== See also ==
- OpenMandriva Lx—a Linux distribution based on Mandriva Linux
- PCLinuxOS—another Linux distribution now independent, but whose start was based on Mandriva Linux
- Unity Linux—Mandriva-based distribution designed to be a base for end-user distributions
