= PCLinuxOS =

Linux distribution

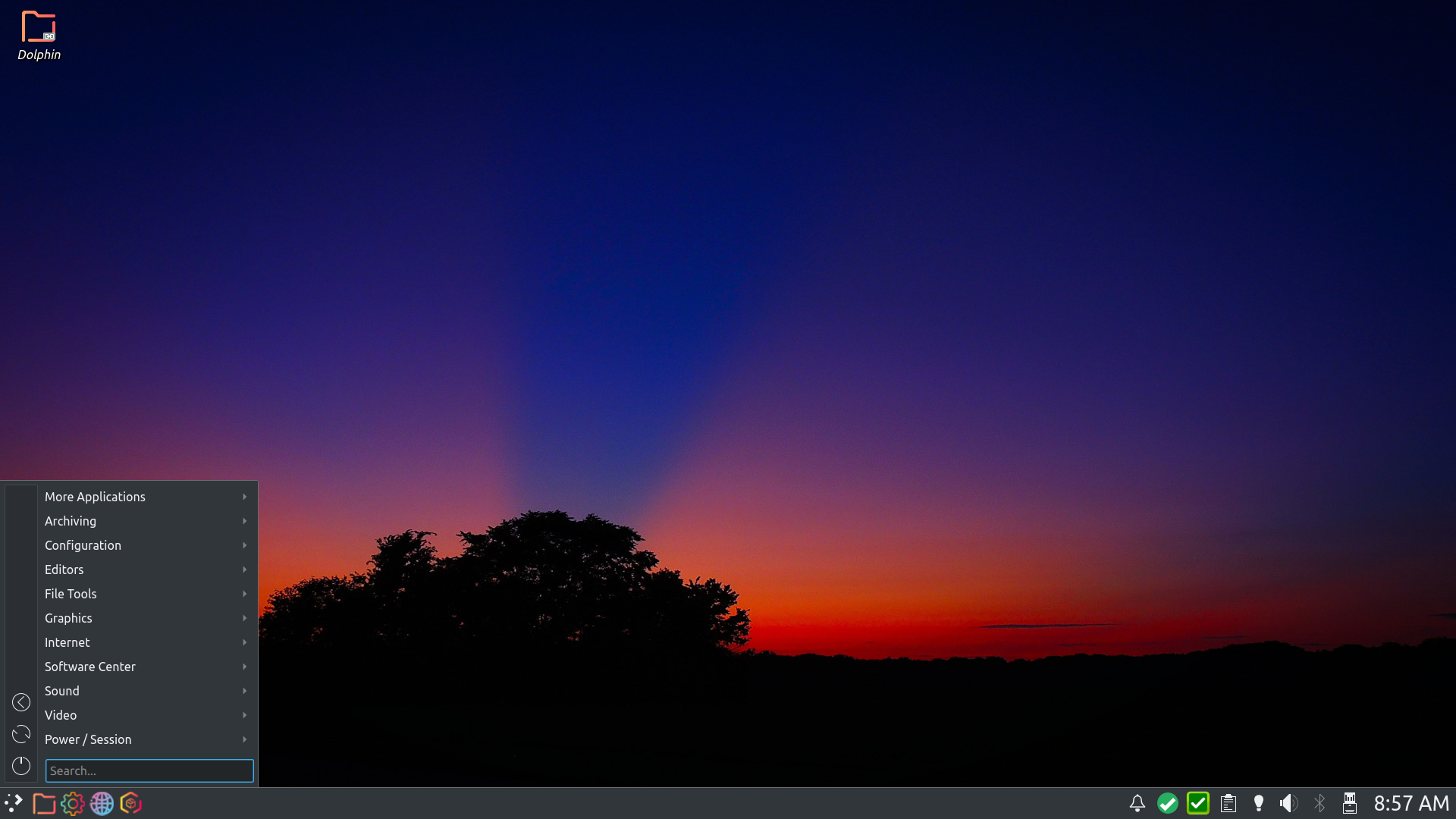
- Screenshot of the PCLinuxOS KDE edition
- Developer: Bill Reynolds aka "Texstar"
- OS family: Unix-like (Linux kernel)
- Working state: Current
- Source model: Open source
- Initial release: October 2003; 22 years ago
- Latest release: 2025.09 / 20 September 2025; 12 months ago
- Update method: Rolling release
- Package manager: APT-RPM
- Supported platforms: x86-64
- Kernel type: Monolithic (Linux)
- Userland: GNU
- Default user interface: KDE Plasma Desktop; MATE; XFCE
- License: Various
- Official website: pclinuxos.com

PCLinuxOS, often shortened to PCLOS, is a rolling-release Linux distribution for x86-64 computers, with KDE Plasma, MATE, and XFCE as its default user interfaces. It is a primarily FOSS operating system for personal computers aimed at ease of use.

== History ==
The precursor to PCLinuxOS was a set of RPM packages created to improve successive versions of Mandrake Linux (later Mandriva Linux). These packages were created by Bill Reynolds, a packager better known as "Texstar". From 2000 to 2003, Texstar maintained his repository of RPM packages in parallel with the PCLinuxOnline site. In an interview, Texstar said he started PCLinuxOS "to provide an outlet for [his] crazy desire to package source code without having to deal with egos, arrogance, and politics."

In October 2003, Texstar created a fork of Mandrake Linux 9.2. Working closely with the Live CD Project, Texstar has since developed that fork independently into a full-fledged distribution. The initial releases were successively numbered as "previews": p5, p7, p8, up to p81a, then p9, p91, p92, and p93.

Although it retains a similar "look and feel" to Mandriva Linux, PCLinuxOS has diverged significantly. The code was officially forked from Mandrake 9.2 into an independent project in 2003. After three years of continuous development, the developers took advantage of further development in (the renamed) Mandriva late in 2006 for PCLinuxOS 2007. In the releases before 2007, it was normally necessary to perform a re-installation.

=== End of official support for 32-bit version ===
On May 10, 2016, main developer Texstar announced the end of support for 32-bit versions of PCLinuxOS. As a result, 32-bit ISOs of the distribution, official 32-bit package updates, and forum support became unavailable. While this doesn't prevent unofficial support, following the announcement only 64-bit ISO images and package updates are available through the official webpage and channels.

=== KDE4 FullMonty (FM) edition (Discontinued) ===
KDE FullMonty (Live & Install DVD) was a regular PCLinuxOS KDE4 installation but was modified to include a special desktop layout and many additional applications and drivers preinstalled. PCLinuxOS officially discontinued the FullMonty edition in 2017 due to KDE developers discontinuing support for KDE4.

- Red Hat Linux
- - DemoLinux
  - - ALT Linux
    - - TinyMe
      - - Granular Linux
        - - Phinx
          - PCLinuxOS

== Releases ==
Almost all major releases have been accompanied by new boot-up and login screens, along with some changes in icon sets, and login sounds.

=== PCLinuxOS 2007 ===
For 2007, PCLinuxOS used a one-time source code snapshot from Mandriva to produce a new independent code base (no longer a fork of Mandriva). This implied a shift to a more modern code, which required a complete reinstallation of this version. The new version featured a new look and built-in 3D effects. A new logo was also designed for the new version and was incorporated into the boot screen. A new login screen was designed, entitled "Dark". The final/official PCLinuxOS 2007 version was released on May 21, 2007.

=== PCLinuxOS 2009 ===
The last version of the 2009 Live CD, PCLinuxOS 2009.2, was released on June 30, 2009. Improvements included bug fixes, new backgrounds, sounds, and start-up screen, as well as quicker start-up times. It was the last PCLinuxOS live CD to ship with K Desktop Environment 3, and the last of the PCLinuxOS 2007 backward compatible series.

Remasters of PCLinuxOS, featuring the Xfce (Phoenix), LXDE (PCLinuxOS-LXDE), and Gnome (PCLinuxOS-Gnome) desktops were also made available.

=== PCLinuxOS 2010 ===
The 2010 version of the Live CD was released on April 19, 2010. It includes the new KDE SC 4.4.2, a new graphical theme and a new version of the Linux Kernel (Kernel 2.6.32.11). It is also the first PCLinuxOS Live CD to include the ext4 file system support. This version required a complete reinstall of the operating system.

While a version of PCLinuxOS that features the GNOME desktop environment was introduced in 2008, the 2010 version is the first one to not only offer the KDE Plasma and GNOME versions, but also versions with Xfce, LXDE, Enlightenment, and Openbox.

=== PCLinuxOS 2010.1 ===
Version 2010.1 was released on May 5, 2010. Changes made since the last version:

- [The] Kernel has been updated to version 2.6.32.12-bfs.
- KDE Plasma Desktop has been upgraded to version 4.4.3.
- Support has been added for Realtek RTL8191SE/RTL8192SE WiFi cards and Microdia webcams.
- Vim console text editor and udftools have been added.
- Fixed CD-ROM ejection when using the Copy to RAM feature.
- Fixed KDE new widget download. Updated nVIDIA (195.36.24) and ATi fglrx (8.723) drivers.
- Updated all supporting applications and libraries from the software repository which include security updates and bug fixes.

=== PCLinuxOS 2011.6 ===
PCLinuxOS 2011.6 version was released on June 27, 2011.

=== PCLinuxOS 2012 ===
PCLinuxOS 2012.02 version was released on February 22, 2012. Later another maintenance release was made on August 22, 2012. Major changes compared to the 2011 release are:

- Kernel has been updated to version 3.2
- KDE version 4.8.2
- nVIDIA and ATi fglrx driver support
- KDE Settings set to dark by default

=== PCLinuxOS 2013 64-bit ===
PCLinuxOS 2013 64-bit first version was released on April 10, 2013.

It featured:

- Kernel 3.2.18-pclos2.bfs for maximum desktop performance.
- Full KDE 4.10.1 Desktop.
- NVIDIA and ATi fglrx driver support.
- Multimedia playback support for many popular formats.
- Wireless support for many network devices.
- Printer support for many local and networked printer devices.
- Addlocale: allows you to translate PCLinuxOS into over 60 languages.
- LibreOffice preinstalled.
- LibreOffice Manager can install LibreOffice supporting over 100 languages.
- MyLiveCD allows you to take a snapshot of your installation and burn it to a LiveCD/DVD.
- PCLinuxOS-liveusb – allows you to install PCLinuxOS on a USB key disk.

=== PCLinuxOS 2014.7 ===
The new version was released on July 7, 2014.

Features:

- kernel 3.15.4 for maximum desktop performance.
- Full KDE 4.12.3 Desktop.
- Nvidia and ATI fglrx driver support.
- Multimedia playback support for many popular formats.
- Wireless support for many network devices.
- Printer support for many local and networked printer devices.
- Addlocale allows you to convert PCLinuxOS into over 60 languages.
- LibreOffice Manager can install LibreOffice supporting over 100 languages.
- MyLiveCD allows you to take a snapshot of your installation and burn it to a LiveCD/DVD.
- PCLinuxOS-liveusb allows you to install PCLinuxOS on a USB key disk.

=== PCLinuxOS 2014.12 ===
KDE, FullMonty, KDE, LXDE and MATE 32 & 64 bit. December 18, 2014

=== 2016 and later ===
- PCLinuxOS 2016.03 - KDE, FullMonty 64 Bit. March 8, 2016
- PCLinuxOS 2016.07 - MATE 64 Bit July 6, 2016
- PCLinuxOS 2017.02 - KDE Plasma 5, MATE 64 Bit February 10, 2017
- PCLinuxOS 2017.03 - KDE Plasma 5 64 Bit March 2, 2017. MATE 64 Bit. March 17, 2017.
- PCLinuxOS 2017.07 - Updated KDE. July 2017.
- PCLinuxOS 2018.06 - KDE June 1, 2018. MATE June 1, 2018.
- PCLinuxOS 2019.06 - KDE June 16, 2019.
- PCLinuxOS 2019.09 - Updated to version 2019.09.
- PCLinuxOS 2019.11 - Updated to 2019.11.
- PCLinuxOS 2020.01 - KDE January 14, 2020
- PCLinuxOS 2020.10 - KDE October 15, 2020
- PCLinuxOS 2021.02 - Updated to version 2021.02.
- PCLinuxOS 2021.11 - Updated KDE, MATE, and XFCE on November 5, 2021.
- PCLinuxOS 2022.01 - Updated KDE, MATE, and XFCE on January 8, 2022.
- PCLinuxOS 2022.07 - KDE, MATE, and XFCE July 2022
- PCLinuxOS 2022.12 - KDE, MATE, and XFCE December 12, 2022
- PCLinuxOS 2023.07 - Updated KDE, MATE, and XFCE on July 30, 2023.
- PCLinuxOS 2024.10 - Updated KDE, MATE, and XFCE on October 17, 2024.
- PCLinuxOS 2025.07 - July 18, 2025
- PCLinuxOS 2025.08 - August 26, 2025

== Features ==
PCLinuxOS places specific emphasis on desktop computing, concentrating its efforts on home or small business environments, hence paying less attention to other more "traditional" uses, like servers.

PCLinuxOS is distributed as a Live CD, which can also be installed on a local hard disk drive or USB flash drive. Beginning from version 2009.1 PCLinuxOS provides a USB installer to create a Live USB, where the user's configuration and personal data can be saved if desired. A live USB of older versions of PCLinuxOS can be created manually or with UNetbootin. The entire CD can be run from memory, assuming the system has sufficient RAM. PCLinuxOS uses APT-RPM, based on APT (Debian), a package management system (originally from the Debian distribution), together with Synaptic Package Manager, a GUI to APT, to add, remove or update packages. If there is enough memory on the machine, and an active network connection, the Live CD can update packages. PCLinuxOS is also designed to be easy to remaster after installation, creating one's personalized Live CD, using the mylivecd tool.

PCLinuxOS maintains its software repository, available via the Advanced Packaging Tool (APT) and its Synaptic front-end, completely replacing Mandriva's urpmi. This means that an installation could be continuously updated to the latest versions of packages, hence sometimes forgoing the need to re-install the entire distribution upon each successive release. Other differences include its menu arrangement, custom graphics and icon sets.

== Community distributions ==
Because PCLinuxOS includes the mklivecd script, there have been several Community distributions over the years based on PCLinuxOS, though they are permitted to mention that connection only if they follow strict guidelines. There are several Community ISO projects associated with PCLinuxOS.

=== Trinity edition ===
The Trinity edition of PCLinuxOS comes in two flavors. "Mini" is a minimalist ISO intended for those who want to customize their desktop with only the programs they want. "Big Daddy", on the other hand, comes with many programs pre-installed, including, but not limited to multimedia codecs and office software.

=== LXQt edition ===
The LXQt edition on PCLinuxOS comes with LXQt's suite of applications and several third-party applications pre-installed.

== Release dates ==
Version	Date
2025.08 KDE, MATE, and XFCE	August 2025
2025.07 KDE, MATE, and XFCE	July 2025
2024.10 KDE, MATE, and XFCE	October 17, 2024
2023.07 KDE, MATE, and XFCE	July 30, 2023
2022.12 KDE, MATE, and XFCE	December 12, 2022
2022.01 KDE, MATE, and XFCE	January 8, 2022
2021.11 KDE, MATE, and XFCE	November 5, 2021
2020.1015 KDE	October 15, 2020
2020.01 KDE	January 14, 2020
2019.06 KDE	June 16, 2019
2018.06 MATE	June 1, 2018
2018.06 KDE	June 1, 2018
2017.07 KDE	July 2017
2017.03 MATE 64 Bit	March 17, 2017
2017.03 KDE Plasma 5 64 Bit	March 2, 2017
2017.02 KDE Plasma 5, MATE 64 Bit	February 10, 2017
2016.07 MATE 64 Bit	July 6, 2016
2016.03 KDE, FullMonty 64 Bit	March 8, 2016
2014.12 KDE, FullMonty, KDE, LXDE and MATE 32 & 64 bit	December 18, 2014
2013.12 KDE, FullMonty, MiniMe, LXDE and MATE 32 & 64 bit	December 3, 2013
2013.7 KDE 32 & 64 bit	July 17, 2013
2013.7 LXDE 32 & 64 bit	July 7, 2013
2013.7 Mate 32 & 64 bit	July 15, 2013
2013.7 KDE-MiniME 32 & 64 bit	July 7, 2013
2013.7 Mate 32 & 64 bit	July 3, 2013
2013.6 Full Monty 64 bit	June 17, 2013
2013.6 LXDE 64 bit	June 17, 2013
2013.4 64 bit	April 10, 2013
2013.4	April 4, 2013
2013.2	February 1, 2013
2012.8	August 22, 2012
2012.2	February 2, 2012
2011.9	September 23, 2011
2011.6	June 27, 2011
2010.12	December 15, 2010
2010.10	October 28, 2010
2010.7	July 5, 2010
2010.1	May 5, 2010
2010	April 19, 2010
2009.2	June 30, 2009
2009.1	March 11, 2009
2008 "MiniMe"	January 7, 2008
P.94 "2007"	May 21, 2007
P.93a "Big Daddy"	August 21, 2006
P.93a "Junior"	August 9, 2006
P.93a "MiniMe"	August 4, 2006
P.93 "MiniMe"	April 21, 2006
P.92	November 21, 2005
P.91	July 7, 2005
P.81a	2005
P.8	2005
P.7	2004
P.5	2004
Original Release	October 2003

== See also ==
- APT-RPM
- Mandriva Linux
