= Urpmi =

Linux package management tool

urpmi
- Original author: Pascal Rigaux
- Developer: Thierry Vignaud
- Stable release: 8.133.1 / June 2, 2024; 2 years ago
- Written in: Perl
- Operating system: Linux
- Type: Package management system
- Website: metacpan.org/release/urpmi

urpmi is a package management tool for installing, removing, updating and querying software packages of local or remote (networked) media. It wraps around the RPM Package Manager in the role of a smart package manager. It uses repositories and will resolve dependencies so that the user will not suffer from dependency hell that can happen when using RPM directly. It works with official sources from Mandriva or unofficial sources such as those from the Penguin Liberation Front. It has a graphical front-end: Rpmdrake.

It's made of 2 parts:

- a low level C/perl bindings
- a higher level perl code implementing the advanced algorithms

In addition to the now-defunct Mandriva Linux, it is also being used by:

- Uruk GNU/Linux, a PureOS-based Linux distribution.
- Mageia, a French fork of Mandriva Linux that for a time was the base for future Mandriva products but is now an independent community driven Linux distribution.
- ROSA Linux, a Russian fork of Mandriva Linux that is the base for future OpenMandriva products.

== History ==
urpmi was developed as an experiment by Pascal Rigaux (Pixel) to address RPM install limitations; it was further maintained by François Pons and different Mandriva employees. It is currently (2010–2024) maintained by Thierry Vignaud who was the maintainer of rpmdrake and one of the co-maintainers of the drakx installer and tools at Mandriva before he continued doing that job at Mageia.

Per Øyvind Karlsen maintained a fork of urpmi at Rosa Linux, backporting fixes and improvements from Thierry Vignaud work, but this is not the version that was used by Mandriva Business Server (which was based on Mageia). This fork died around 2013 (date of last commit).

== Commands ==
=== Generic commands ===
Install package	urpmi <package_name>
Uninstall package with link (dependencies)	urpme <package_name>
Query the package database	urpmq <package_name>
Find package that contains a file	urpmf <file>
Find package knowing only a part of an rpm name	urpmq --fuzzy <part-of-package_name>
Update your package list	urpmi.update -a
Update your system (using all repositories)	urpmi --auto-select
Update your system (only using update repositories)	urpmi --update --auto-select

=== Useful commands ===
Find package containing <word> in their name	urpmq -y <word>
Find package without link (dependencies)	urpmi_rpm-find-leaves

== See also ==
- AppStream
- PackageKit
