= Mandriva =

Public software company

Mandriva S.A.
- Company type: Société Anonyme
- Industry: Software industry
- Founded: 1998 (MandrakeSoft); 2005 (Conectiva)
- Defunct: 2015
- Fate: Dissolved
- Headquarters: Paris, France
- Products: Mandriva Linux
- Website: www.mandriva.com/en/ at the Wayback Machine (archived 24 May 2015)

Mandriva S.A. was a public software company specializing in Linux and open-source software. Its corporate headquarters were in Paris, and it had development centers in Metz, France and Curitiba, Brazil. Mandriva, S.A. was the developer and maintainer of a Linux distribution called Mandriva Linux, as well as various enterprise software products. Mandriva was a founding member of the Desktop Linux Consortium.

== History ==
Mandriva, S.A. began as MandrakeSoft in 1998.

In February 2004, following lengthy litigation with the Hearst Corporation over the name "Mandrake" (the Hearst Corporation owned a comic strip called Mandrake the Magician), MandrakeSoft was required to change its name. Following the acquisition of the Brazilian Linux distribution Conectiva in February 2005, the company's name was changed on 7 April 2005 to "Mandriva" to reflect the names "MandrakeSoft" and "Conectiva."

On October 4, 2004, MandrakeSoft acquired the professional support company Edge IT, which focused on the corporate market in France and had 6 employees.

On June 15, 2005, Mandriva acquired Lycoris (formerly, Redmond Linux Corporation).

On October 5, 2006, Mandriva signed an agreement to acquire Linbox, a Linux enterprise software infrastructure company. The agreement included the acquisition of all shares of Linbox for a total of $1.739 million in Mandriva stock, plus an earn out of up to $401,000 based on the 2006 Linbox financials.

In 2007, Mandriva reached a deal with the Government of Nigeria to install Mandriva Linux on 17,000 school computers. Despite this, they announced a change of plans to instead use Windows XP, but later backpedaled and proceeded with Mandriva Linux.

On January 16, 2008, Mandriva and Turbolinux announced a partnership to create a lab named Manbo-Labs, to share resources and technology to release a common base system for both companies' Linux distributions.

Although Mandriva's operating system eventually became a significant entity in the data center, the company's operating margins were thin and by 2012 the company was on the brink of bankruptcy. On January 30, 2012, Mandriva announced that an external entity bid was rejected by a minority share holder and the deal did not go through. At the end of the first semester 2012, a solution to the situation that had appeared in January of the same year was found and a settlement achieved. Mandriva was subsequently owned by several different shareholders.

Mandriva filed for administrative receivership in early 2015, and was liquidated on May 22, 2015. The Mandriva Linux distribution continues to survive as OpenMandriva Lx. Notable forks include Mageia Linux and ROSA Linux.

== Mandriva Club ==
In addition to selling Linux distributions through its online store and authorized resellers, Mandriva previously sold subscriptions to the Mandriva Club. There were several levels of membership, at costs ranging from US$66 or €60 per year (as of 2007) to €600 per year.

Club members gained access to the Club website, additional mirrors and torrents for downloading, free downloads of its boxed products (depending on membership level), interim releases of the Mandriva Linux distribution, and additional software updates. For example, only Gold-level and higher members could download Powerpack+ editions.

Many Mandriva commercial products came with short-term membership in the club; however, Mandriva Linux was completely usable without a club membership.

When Mandriva Linux 2008.0 was released in October 2007, Mandriva made club membership free of charge to all comers, splitting download subscriptions off into a separate service.

Mandriva also had a Mandriva Corporate Club for larger organizations.

== Products ==
Mandriva Linux
A Linux distribution
Pulse²
Open-source software for application deployment, inventory, and maintenance of an IT network, also available as SaaS version as of November 2012.
Mandriva Business Server
A Linux-based server operating system
Mandriva Class
E-learning software enabling distributed, long-distance virtual classrooms.
