= Kudzu (disambiguation) =

Kudzu, a climbing, coiling, and trailing vine in the genus Pueraria, native to southern Japan and southeast China

Kudzu may also refer to:

- Kudzu (band), a southern-rock band in the early 1970's
- Kudzu (comic strip), Doug Marlette's daily comic strip created in May 1981
- Kudzu (newspaper), a newspaper published in Jackson, Mississippi starting in September 1968
- Kudzu (computer daemon), a Red Hat Linux hardware probing library
- Kudzu bug, a type of stinkbug and pest to crops - the Megacopta cribraria. Originally in India and China but recently infesting the south eastern United States
- Kudzu.com, advertising service
- Kudzu, a series of American sports racing cars built by Jim Downing
