= Synona obscura =

Scientific classification
- Kingdom: Animalia
- Phylum: Arthropoda
- Clade: Pancrustacea
- Class: Insecta
- Order: Coleoptera
- Suborder: Polyphaga
- Infraorder: Cucujiformia
- Family: Coccinellidae
- Genus: Synona
- Species: S. obscura

Binomial name
- Synona obscura Poorani, Slipinski & Booth, 2008

Species of beetle

Synona obscura, is a species of lady beetle found in India (Karnataka, Kerala, Tamil Nadu) and Sri Lanka.

== Description ==
Adults reach a length of about 5.1–6.8 mm (0.20–0.27 in). They have a broad, subcircular body. The head and pronotum are bright yellow-orange and the elytra are black. The ventral surface is yellow-orange.

== Biology ==
It is a predator of several aphids and mealybugs such as, Coptosoma ostensum, Megacopta cribraria, and Aphis craccivora. Host plants include: Butea monosperma, Lablab purpureus, Cajanus cajan, Sesbania grandiflora, Santalum album, Trichosanthes cucumerina, Brassica oleracea, Anacardium occidentale, and Trewia.

Larvae occasionally parasitized by Nothoserphus mirabilis and Homalotylus flaminius.

== Etymology ==
The species name refers to the fact that it has remained unrecognised as a distinct species, though commonly collected.
