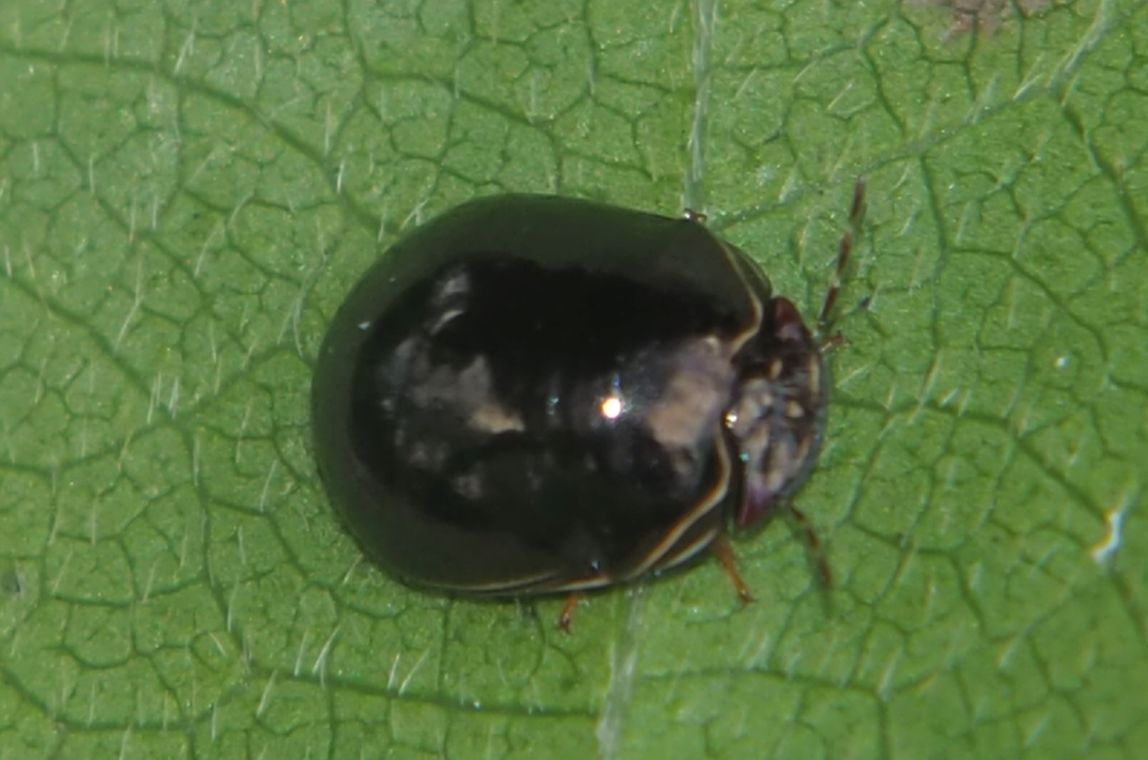
- Adult black bean bug

Scientific classification
- Kingdom: Animalia
- Phylum: Arthropoda
- Class: Insecta
- Order: Hemiptera
- Suborder: Heteroptera
- Family: Plataspidae
- Genus: Brachyplatys
- Species: B. subaeneus

Binomial name
- Brachyplatys subaeneus (Westwood, 1837)

Synonyms
- Plataspis subaeneus Westwood, 1837

= Brachyplatys subaeneus =

Species of true bug

Brachyplatys subaeneus, also referred to as the black bean bug, is a species of shield bugs belonging to the family Plataspidae, occurring throughout much of Asia, and invasive elsewhere. It is known to be a pest, particularly in legume crops, but infests a wide range of plant species.

== Distribution ==
This species occurs over much of Asia, from India eastward to Japan and Southeast Asia. Black bean bugs were found for the first time in the Western Hemisphere in 2012 in Panama, though initially misidentified. There have been additional verified reports subsequently from Costa Rica, the Dominican Republic, Ecuador, and the United States (in the state of Florida, in 2020).

== Biology ==
Females produce 300–400 eggs, laid over a period of several months, deposited in hidden locations on or near host plants. Nymphs and adults tend to aggregate on stems or on petioles under leaves, where they feed on plant fluids. Black bean bugs show a clear preference for Fabaceae (legumes), attacking cosmopolitan crops such as common beans (Phaseolus spp.), cowpeas (Vigna spp.), soybean (Glycine max) and pigeon pea (Cajanus cajan), but they also are reported to damage crop plants in several other plant families, such as corn, hemp, sweet potato, potato, sugarcane, and rice. Given the wide range of hosts and the economic value of several of these crops, the potential economic consequences of the spread of this insect are considered significant.
