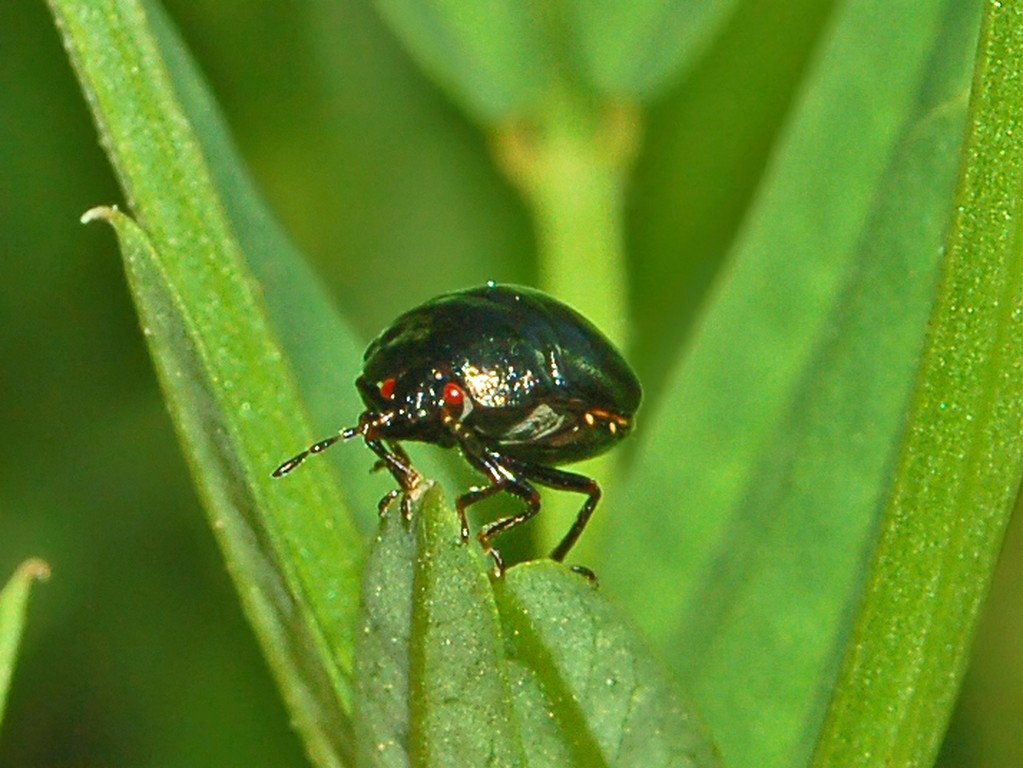

Scientific classification
- Kingdom: Animalia
- Phylum: Arthropoda
- Clade: Pancrustacea
- Class: Insecta
- Order: Hemiptera
- Suborder: Heteroptera
- Family: Plataspidae
- Genus: Coptosoma
- Species: C. elegans

Binomial name
- Coptosoma elegans (Stål, 1876)

= Coptosoma elegans =

Species of true bug

Coptosoma elegans is a species belonging to the family Plataspidae, subfamily Plataspinae. It is often confused for a beetle due to its appearance, but it is a true bug.
