= Red Hat Linux =

Linux distribution

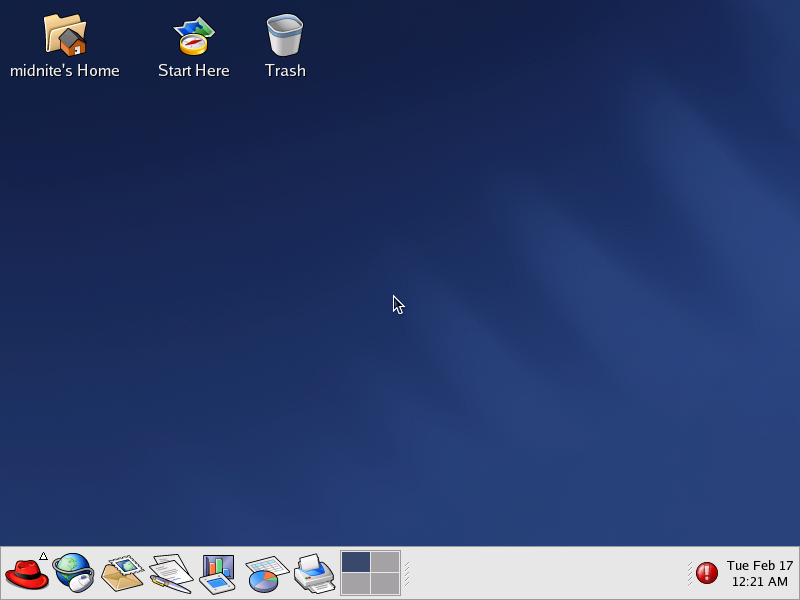
- GNOME 2.2, the default desktop on Red Hat Linux 9
- Developer: Red Hat
- OS family: Linux (Unix-like)
- Working state: Discontinued
- Source model: Open source
- Initial release: May 13, 1995; 31 years ago
- Final release: 9 alias Shrike / March 31, 2003; 23 years ago
- Package manager: RPM Package Manager
- Kernel type: Monolithic (Linux)
- Userland: GNU
- License: Various
- Succeeded by: Red Hat Enterprise Linux, Fedora Linux
- Official website: www.redhat.com/en

Red Hat Linux was a widely used commercial open-source Linux distribution created by Red Hat until its discontinuation in 2004.

Early releases of Red Hat Linux were called Red Hat Commercial Linux. Red Hat published the first non-beta release in May 1995. It included the Red Hat Package Manager as its packaging format, and over time RPM has served as the starting point for several other distributions, such as Mandriva Linux and Yellow Dog Linux.

In 2003, Red Hat discontinued the Red Hat Linux line in favor of Red Hat Enterprise Linux (RHEL) for enterprise environments. Fedora Linux, developed by the community-supported Fedora Project and sponsored by Red Hat, is a free-of-cost alternative intended for home use. Red Hat Linux 9, the final release, hit its official end-of-life on April 30, 2004, although updates were published for it through 2006 by the Fedora Legacy project until the updates were discontinued in early 2007.

== Features ==
Version 3.0.3 was one of the first Linux distributions to support ELF (Executable and Linkable Format) binaries instead of the older a.out format.

Red Hat Linux introduced a graphical installer called Anaconda developed by Ketan Bagal, intended to be easy to use for novices, and which has since been adopted by some other Linux distributions. It also introduced a built-in tool called Lokkit for configuring the firewall capabilities.

In version 6 Red Hat moved to glibc 2.1, egcs-1.2, and to the 2.2 kernel. It was the first version to use the GNOME as its default graphical environment instead of FVWM95 and included KDE as an option. It also introduced Kudzu, a software library for automatic discovery and configuration of hardware.

Version 7 was released in preparation for the 2.4 kernel, although the first release still used the stable 2.2 kernel. Glibc was updated to version 2.1.92, which was a beta of the upcoming version 2.2 and Red Hat used a patched version of GCC from CVS that they called "2.96". The decision to ship an unstable GCC version was due to GCC 2.95's bad performance on non-i386 platforms, especially DEC Alpha. Newer GCCs had also improved support for the C++ standard, which caused much of the existing code not to compile.

In particular, the use of a non-released version of GCC caused some criticism, e.g. from Linus Torvalds and the GCC Steering Committee; Red Hat was forced to defend this decision. GCC 2.96 failed to compile the Linux kernel, and some other software used in Red Hat, due to stricter checks. It also had an incompatible C++ ABI with other compilers. The distribution included a previous version of GCC for compiling the kernel, called "kgcc".

Version 8.0 was also the second to include the Bluecurve desktop theme. It used a common theme for GNOME-2 and KDE 3.0.2 desktops, as well as OpenOffice-1.0. KDE members did not appreciate the change, claiming that it was not in the best interests of KDE.

Version 9 supported the Native POSIX Thread Library, which was ported to the 2.4 series kernel by Red Hat.

Red Hat Linux lacked many features due to possible copyright and patent problems. For example, MP3 support was disabled in both Rhythmbox and XMMS; instead, Red Hat recommended using Ogg Vorbis, which has no patents. MP3 support, however, could be installed afterwards, through the use of packages. Support for Microsoft's NTFS file system was also missing, but could be freely installed as well.

== Fedora Linux ==
Red Hat Linux was originally developed exclusively inside Red Hat, with the only feedback from users coming through bug reports and contributions to the included software packages – not contributions to the distribution as such. This was changed in late 2003 when Red Hat Linux merged with the community-based Fedora Project. The new plan was to draw most of the codebase from Fedora Linux when creating new Red Hat Enterprise Linux distributions. Fedora Linux replaced the original Red Hat Linux download and retail version. The model is similar to the relationship between Netscape Communicator and Mozilla, or StarOffice and OpenOffice.org, although in this case the resulting commercial product was also fully free software.

== Version history ==
Box cover shot of Red Hat Linux 5.2

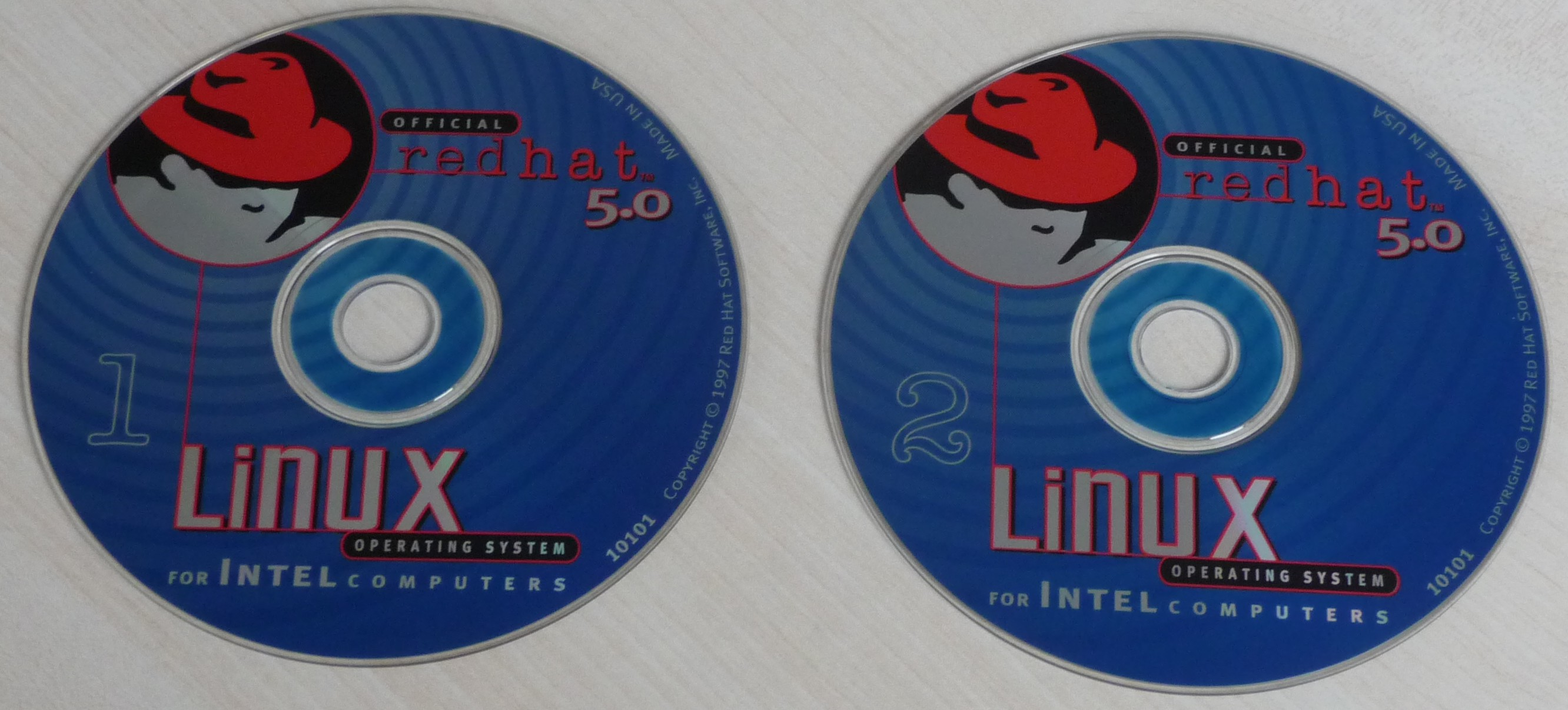
Red Hat 5.0 CDROMs

Release dates were drawn from announcements on comp.os.linux.announce. Version names are chosen to be cognitively related to the prior release, yet not related in the same way as the release before that.

The Fedora and Red Hat Projects were merged on September 22, 2003.

Red Hat Linux release history
Version	Type	Code name	Release date	Kernel version	Comment
—N/a	test	Preview	26 June 1994	1.1.18 (dev)	First test release, not publicly distributed. It used the RPP package manager.
0.9	beta	Halloween	31 October 1994	1.0.9 (stable); 1.1.54 (dev)	Purchased beta, came with documentation and graphical system management tools.
1	stable	Mother's Day	May 1995	1.2.8	ACC Bookstores (Bob Young) bought out Red Hat Software, Inc. (Mark Ewing) and introduced the "Red Hat Commercial Linux" moniker.
1.1	bug fix	Mother's Day+0.1	August 1995	1.2.11; 1.2.13	Called "Mother's Day Plus One".
2.0	stable	—N/a	20 September 1995	1.2.13–2	First stable RPM release, and the first one to use the "Red Hat LiNUX" branding.
2.1	bug fix	Bluesky	23 November 1995	1.2.13 (stable); 1.3.32 (dev)	The first Alpha release (January 1996) was based on this version.
3.0.3	stable	Picasso	1 May 1996	1.2.13	First version released for multiple architectures and executable formats (x86/Alpha, ELF/a.out) at the same time. Introduced the Metro-X server, glint graphical management tool for RPM, and graphical printer configuration.
3.9	beta	Rembrandt	July–August 1996	2.0	RPM was rewritten in C. PAM and kernel modules were introduced.
4.0	stable	Colgate	3 October 1996	2.0.18	Added support for SPARC architecture and ELF executables on Alpha. Introduced Shadowman™ logo, free electronic format documentation and the Red Baron browser.
4.1	stable	Vanderbilt	3 February 1997	2.0.27	InfoWorld, Best of 1996, Operating Systems.
4.2	stable	Biltmore	19 May 1997	2.0.30–2	Shipped the old libc 5.3 instead of the buggy 5.4 release. This decision was widely criticised, but avoided many issues.
4.8	beta	Thunderbird	27 August 1997	?	Introduced glibc 2.0.
4.9	beta	Mustang	7 November 1997	?	Cemented the two-cycle beta release style due to massive changes in the C library version.
5.0	stable	Hurricane	1 December 1997	2.0.32–2	Introduced BRU2000-PE™ backup and the Real Audio™ client and server. 1997 InfoWorld Product of the Year.
5.1	stable	Manhattan	22 May 1998	2.0.34–0.6	Introduced the Linux Applications CD, GNOME preview version (separate, not default), linuxconf, and the Netscape browser. Last release to load a live filesystem from the CD.
5.2	stable	Apollo	2 November 1998	2.0.36–0.7	GNOME technology preview (separate, not default).
5.9	beta	Starbuck	17 March 1999	?	
6.0	stable	Hedwig	26 April 1999	2.2.5–15	Introduced glibc 2.1, egcs, and Linux 2.2. GNOME 1 was integrated.
6.0.50	beta	Lorax	6 September 1999	?	Introduced a completely rewritten graphical installer (anaconda), with graphical mode and text mode implemented in Python.
6.1	stable	Cartman	4 October 1999	2.2.12–20	InfoWorld, 1999 Product of the Year, Operating Systems and multiple other awards.
6.1.92	beta	Piglet	9 February 2000	?	
6.2	stable	Zoot	3 April 2000	2.2.14–5.0	First release to offer ISO images for FTP download.
6.2EE	stable	Enterprise	?	?	First Enterprise Edition, offering longer support level.
6.9.5	beta	Pinstripe	31 July 2000	?	
7	stable	Guinness	25 September 2000	2.2.16–22	First release to support Red Hat Network out of the box. Caused the gcc 2.96 flame war, leading to the 2.96RH name being used later.
7.0.90	beta	Fisher	31 January 2001	2.4	First release with Linux 2.4.
7.0.91	beta	Wolverine	21 February 2001	?	
7.1	stable	Seawolf	16 April 2001	2.4.2–2	First release to debut a new kernel stream out of the beta cycle. First release to simultaneously support all included languages. Introduced the Mozilla browser.
7.1.93	beta	Roswell	2 August 2001	?	ext3 becomes default; the installer offers to convert ext2 filesystems. LILO replaced with GRUB as the default bootloader.
7.2	stable	Enigma	22 October 2001	2.4.7–10	GNOME 1.4, KDE 2.2. Would serve as the development basis for RHEL 2.1 AS (Pensacola).
7.2A	stable	EnigmaA	29 December 2001	2.4.17	GNOME 1.4, KDE 2.2.2. Has version in the letter A.
7.2.91	beta	Skipjack	22 March 2002	?	Expected to ship a lot of new programs (gcc 3, GTK 2, Python 2) that were postponed for 8.0.
7.3	stable	Valhalla	6 May 2002	2.4.18–3	KDE updated to 3.0.0. Last release with the Netscape browser.
7.3.29	beta	Limbo	4 July 2002	?	700 MB ISO images were tested, but they proved problematic.
8.0	stable	Psyche	30 September 2002	2.4.18–14	gcc 3.2, glibc 2.3 RC, OpenOffice 1.0.1, GNOME 2, KDE 3.0.3. Introduced the Bluecurve™ cross-environment unified look and feel.
9	stable	Shrike	31 March 2003	2.4.20–8	KDE 3.1 and GNOME 2.2. Introduced NPTL support with glibc 2.3.2 and kernel 2.4.20. Would serve as the development basis for RHEL 3.
9.0.93	beta	Severn	21 July 2003	?	Final RHL release. It would be merged with Fedora Linux to form release Fedora Core 1 test 2, version 0.94.

== See also ==
- Fedora Linux release history
- List of Linux distributions
- Think Blue Linux
