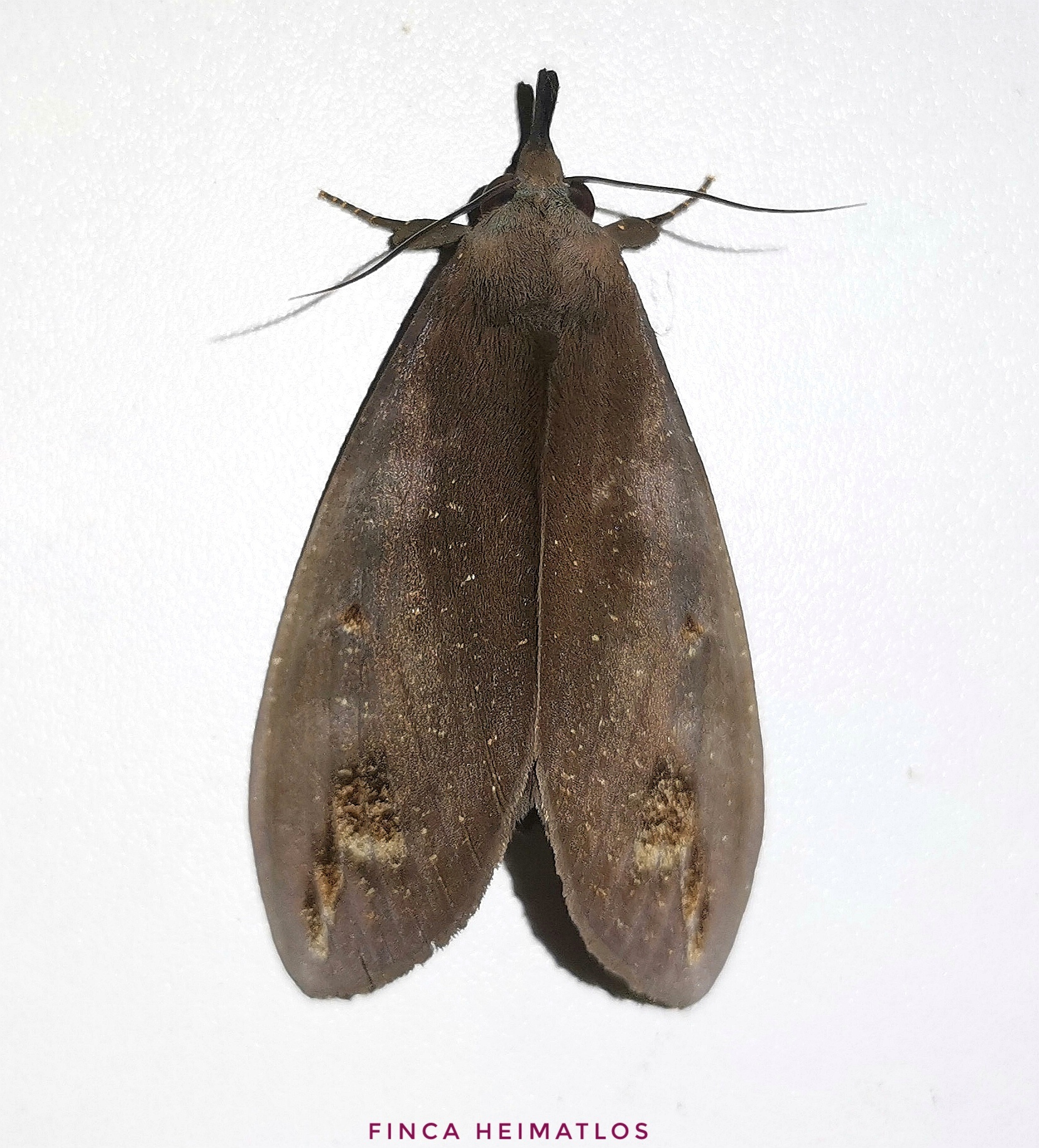
- Tetrisia florigera, Ecuador

Scientific classification
- Kingdom: Animalia
- Phylum: Arthropoda
- Clade: Pancrustacea
- Class: Insecta
- Order: Lepidoptera
- Superfamily: Noctuoidea
- Family: Erebidae
- Subfamily: Calpinae
- Genus: Tetrisia; Walker, 1867
- Species: T. florigera

Binomial name
- Tetrisia florigera Walker, 1867

Synonyms
- Graphigona magnifica Schaus, 1911; Graphigona roseifer Felder & Rogenhofer, 1874

= Tetrisia (moth) =

Genus of moths

Tetrisia is an invalid genus name for a species of moths in the family Erebidae, containing a single species, T. florigera. It was described by Francis Walker in 1867. It lives in Central America and South America, including Costa Rica, Brazil and Colombia.

The genus name is a homonym of Tetrisia Walker, 1867, a genus of plataspid bugs, published four months earlier, so the moth name must be formally replaced.

The species Dysschema tricolora (Sulzer, 1776) has been mistakenly listed in the literature under the genus Tetrisia.
