= Synona melanopepla =

Scientific classification
- Kingdom: Animalia
- Phylum: Arthropoda
- Clade: Pancrustacea
- Class: Insecta
- Order: Coleoptera
- Suborder: Polyphaga
- Infraorder: Cucujiformia
- Family: Coccinellidae
- Genus: Synona
- Species: S. melanopepla

Binomial name
- Synona melanopepla (Mulsant, 1850)

Synonyms
- Synia melanopepla Mulsant, 1850; Leis rougeti Mulsant, 1866; Lemnia melanoptera Iablokoff-Khnzorian, 1978; Lemnia martini Iablokoff-Khnzorian, 1984

Species of beetle

Synona melanopepla is a species of beetle of the family Coccinellidae. It is found in India (Assam, Bihar, Karnataka, Meghalaya, Orissa, Tamil Nadu, Uttar Pradesh) and Vietnam.

== Description ==
Adults reach a length of about 6.9–7.6 mm (0.27–0.30 in). They have a circular, hemispherical body. The head is yellow, sometimes with two black markings. The pronotum is yellow-orange, sometimes with a black marking. The scutellum is yellow, sometimes yellowish testaceous with a darker border or dark brown. The elytra are black. The ventral surface is yellow-orange.

== Life history ==
They have been recorded feeding on Psyllidae species on Ficus species, as well as on Megacopta cribraria.
