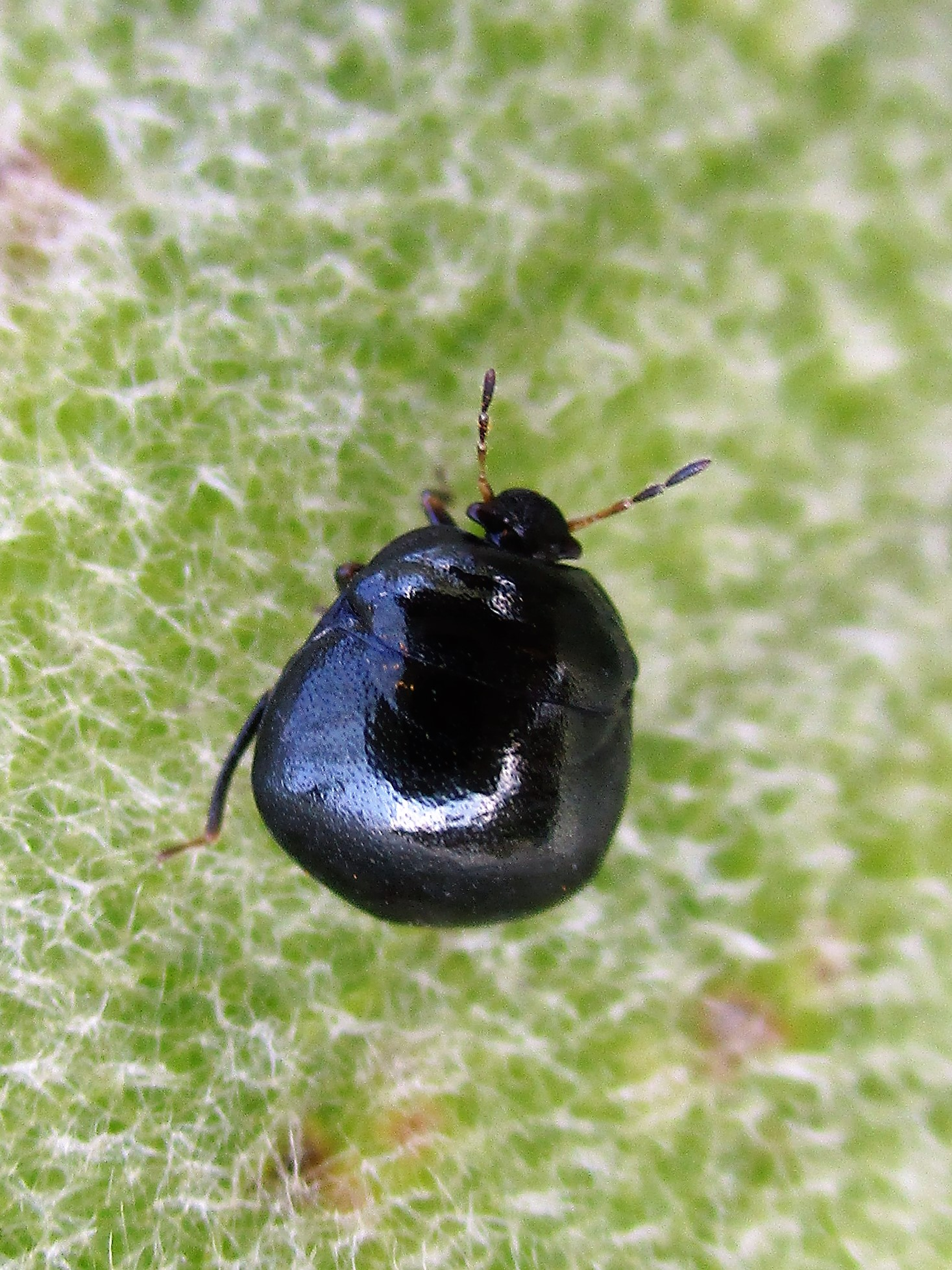
- Coptosoma scutellatum
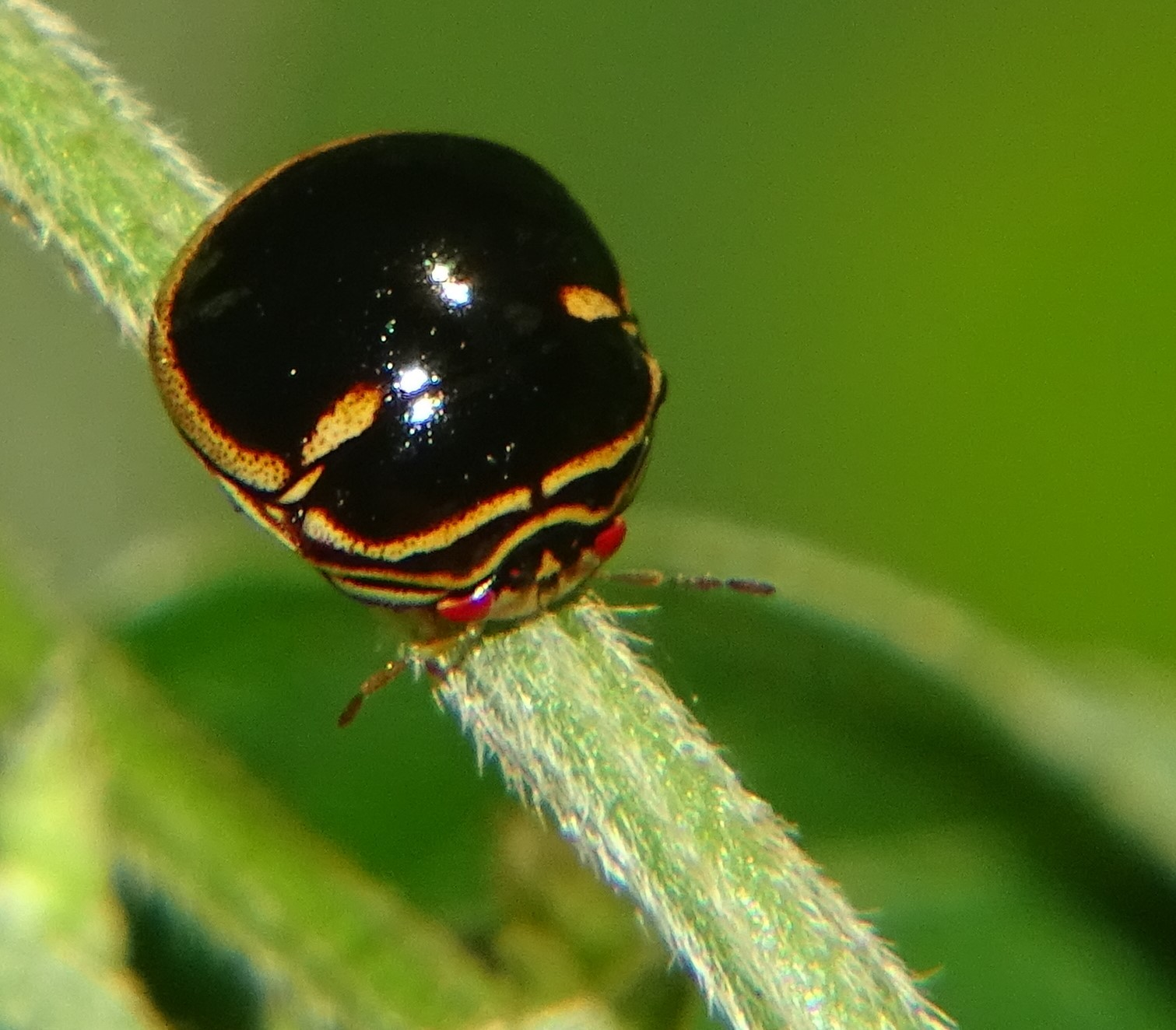
- Black stink bug (Coptosoma xanthogramma)

Scientific classification
- Kingdom: Animalia
- Phylum: Arthropoda
- Class: Insecta
- Order: Hemiptera
- Suborder: Heteroptera
- Family: Plataspidae
- Subfamily: Plataspinae
- Genus: Coptosoma; Laporte, 1833

= Coptosoma =

Genus of true bugs

Coptosoma is a genus of true bugs belonging to the family Plataspidae, subfamily Plataspinae.

== Selected species ==
- Coptosoma costale Stål, 1853
- Coptosoma elegans (Stål, 1876)
- Coptosoma mucronatum Seidenstücker, 1963
- Coptosoma sandahli Reuter, 1881
- Coptosoma scutellatum (Geoffroy, 1785)
- Coptosoma xanthogramma (White, 1884)
