= Synona consanguinea =

Scientific classification
- Kingdom: Animalia
- Phylum: Arthropoda
- Clade: Pancrustacea
- Class: Insecta
- Order: Coleoptera
- Suborder: Polyphaga
- Infraorder: Cucujiformia
- Family: Coccinellidae
- Genus: Synona
- Species: S. consanguinea

Binomial name
- Synona consanguinea Poorani, Ślipiński & Booth, 2008

Species of beetle

Synona consanguinea is a species of beetle of the family Coccinellidae. It is found in Taiwan, China (Guangdong), Myanmar, Thailand and Vietnam.

== Description ==
Adults reach a length of about 4.9–5.1 mm (0.19–0.20 in). They have a circular body, with the dorsum strongly hemispherical and convex. The head and pronotum are bright orange-yellow, while the scutellum and elytra are black. The ventral surface is mostly yellowish-testaceous.

== Etymology ==
The species name is derived from Latin con- (meaning with, together) and sanguis (meaning blood) and refers to its close resemblance to the other species of Synona.
