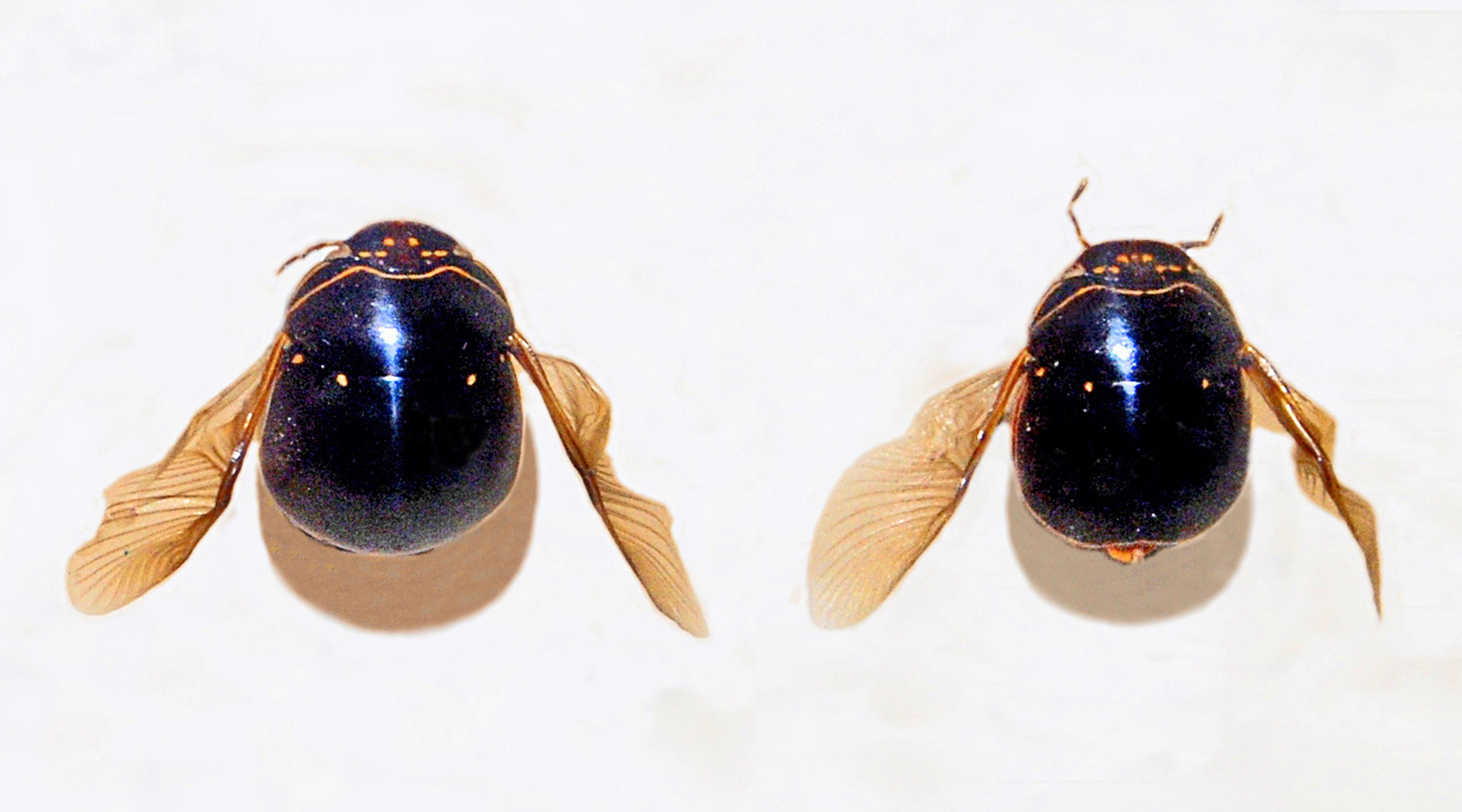
- Brachyplatys punctipes

Scientific classification
- Kingdom: Animalia
- Phylum: Arthropoda
- Class: Insecta
- Order: Hemiptera
- Suborder: Heteroptera
- Family: Plataspidae
- Genus: Brachyplatys
- Species: B. punctipes

Binomial name
- Brachyplatys punctipes Montandon, 1894

= Brachyplatys punctipes =

Species of true bug

Brachyplatys punctipes is a species of shield bugs belonging to the family Plataspidae found in China.
