= Synona =

Scientific classification
- Kingdom: Animalia
- Phylum: Arthropoda
- Clade: Pancrustacea
- Class: Insecta
- Order: Coleoptera
- Suborder: Polyphaga
- Infraorder: Cucujiformia
- Family: Coccinellidae
- Subfamily: Coccinellinae
- Tribe: Coccinellini
- Genus: Synona; Pope, 1989

Synonyms
- Synia Mulsant, 1850 (nec. Synia Duponchel, 1845)

Genus of beetles

Synona is a genus of beetles belonging to the family Coccinellidae.

== Species ==
- Synona consanguinea
- Synona melanaria
- Synona melanopepla
- Synona obscura
- Synona philippinensis
