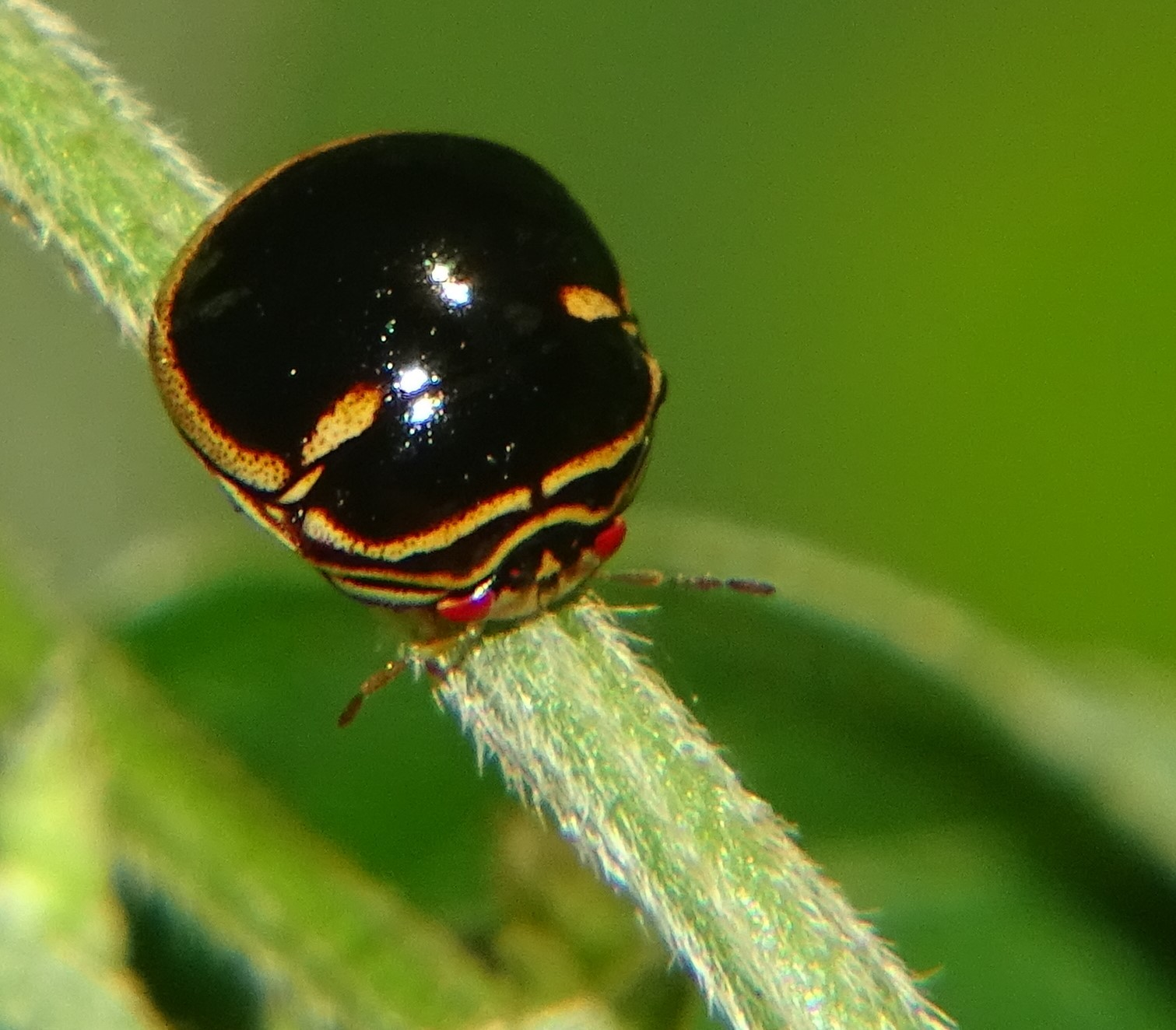
- Coptosoma xanthogramma in Hawaii

Scientific classification
- Kingdom: Animalia
- Phylum: Arthropoda
- Class: Insecta
- Order: Hemiptera
- Suborder: Heteroptera
- Family: Plataspidae
- Genus: Coptosoma
- Species: C. xanthogramma

Binomial name
- Coptosoma xanthogramma (White, 1884)

= Coptosoma xanthogramma =

Insect in Hawaii

Coptosoma xanthogramma is a species of true bugs belonging to the family Plataspidae and sub-order Heteroptera. It is commonly known as the black stink bug.

It is endemic to Asia and has been found on Luzon in the Philippines, Oahu in Hawaii, Guam and Iwo Jima, Volcano Islands. It is an invasive pest, feeding on legumes and similar plants.

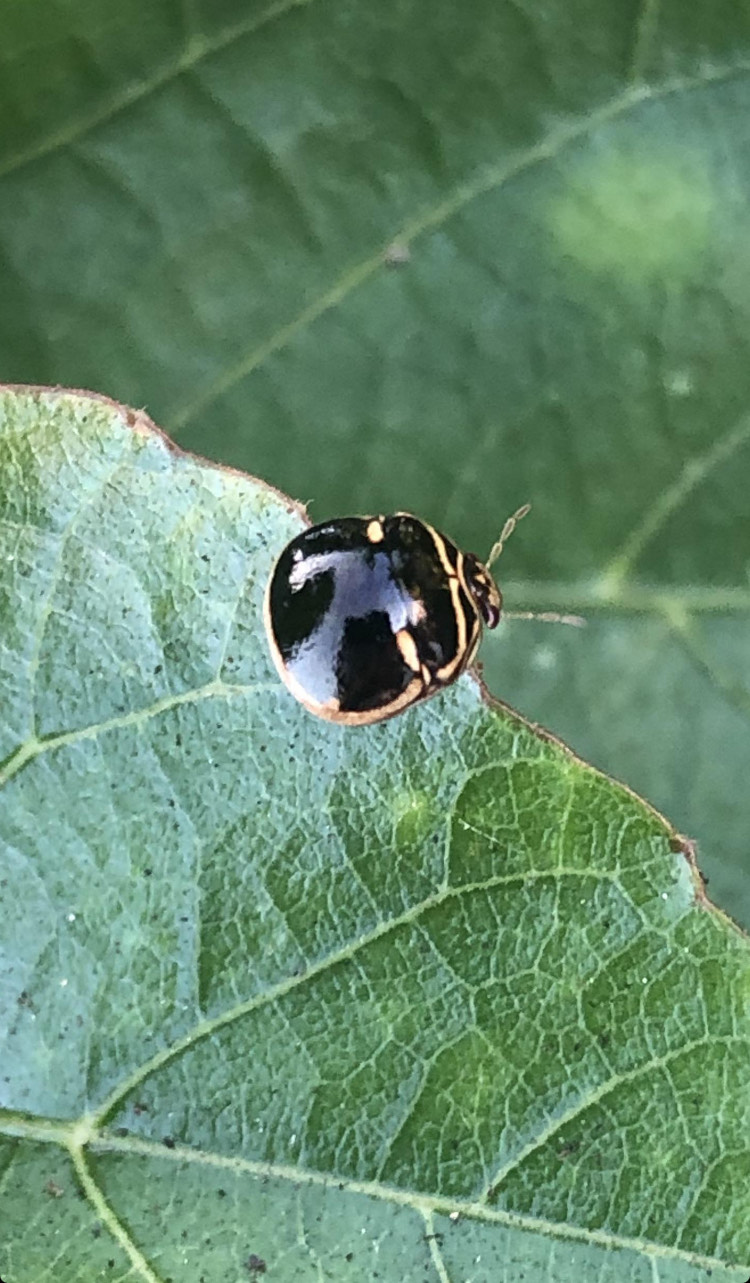
Coptosoma xanthogramma picture.
