= Think Blue Linux =

Linux distribution

Think Blue Linux (sometimes ThinkBlue Linux) is a discontinued port of Linux to IBM S/390 (later, zSeries) mainframe computers, done by the Millenux subsidiary of the German company Thinking Objects Software GmbH.

The distribution consists primarily of a collection of Red Hat Linux 6.1 packages (or RPM) on top of IBM's port of the Linux kernel. Distribution of the product by the authors ceased on February 16, 2006.
