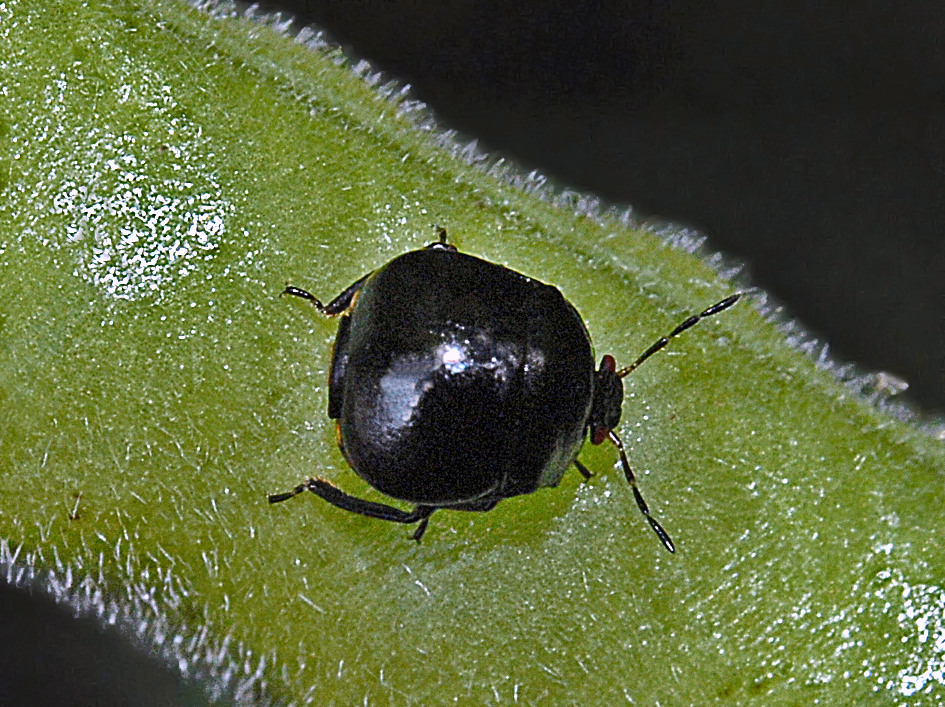
- Dorsal view
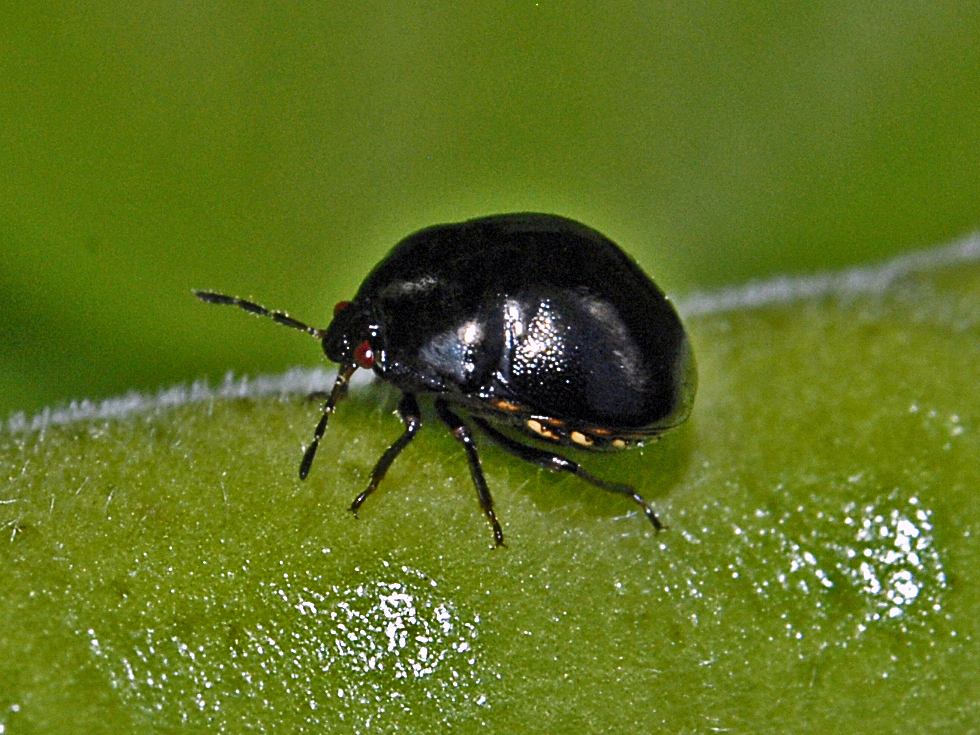
- Lateral view

Scientific classification
- Kingdom: Animalia
- Phylum: Arthropoda
- Clade: Pancrustacea
- Class: Insecta
- Order: Hemiptera
- Suborder: Heteroptera
- Family: Plataspidae
- Genus: Coptosoma
- Species: C. scutellatum

Binomial name
- Coptosoma scutellatum (Geoffroy, 1785)

= Coptosoma scutellatum =

Species of true bug

Coptosoma scutellatum is a species of true bugs belonging to the family Plataspidae, subfamily Plataspinae.

== Description ==
Coptosoma scutellatum can reach a size of about 4–5 mm. These small true bugs are almost spherical or trapezoidal in shape and shiny deep black, sometimes with green, blue or bronze gloss. The side edges of the abdomen are yellow. The scutellum covers the abdomen and the tarsus is bipartite.

== Distribution ==
This species can be found in most of southern Europe and it is widespread from North Africa to Siberia, China, Korea and Japan. In Europe it is missing in the British Isles.

It is one of the four European species of Coptosoma, most of other being restricted to Asia and Ethiopia.

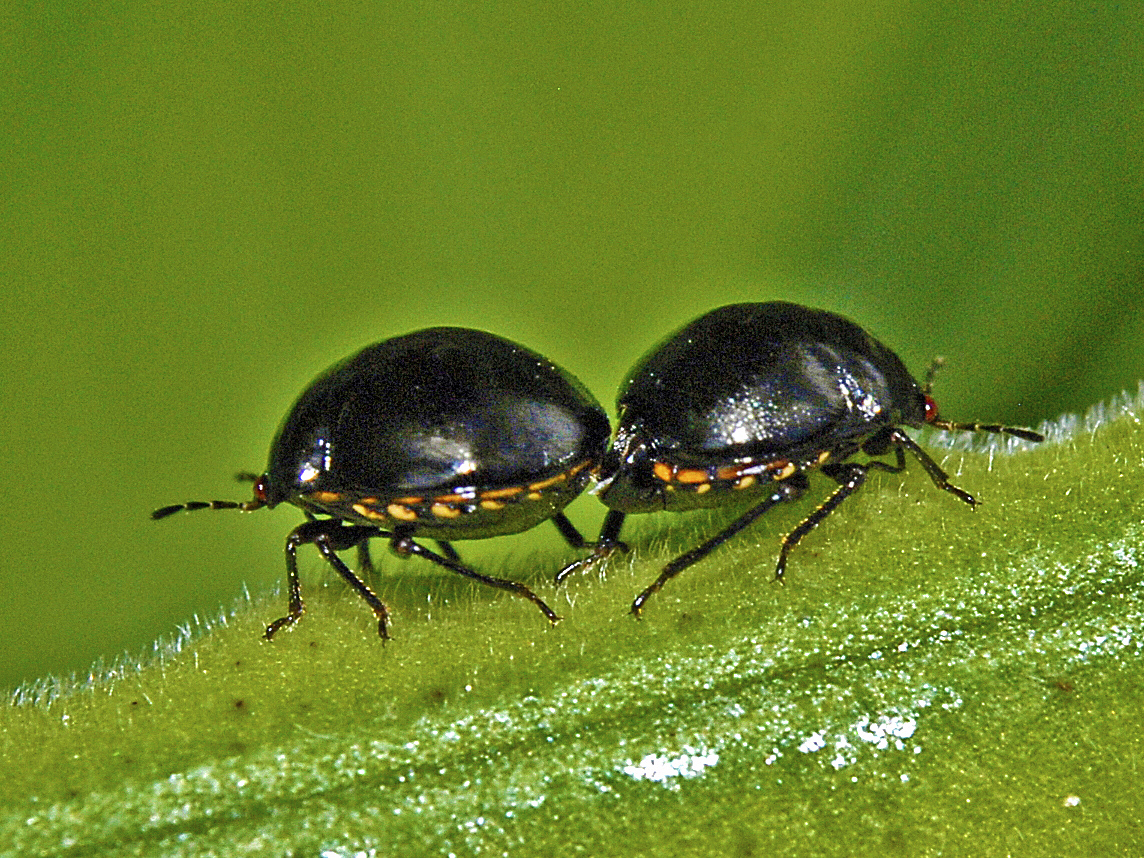
Mating couple

== Habitat ==
These thermophile bugs live in dry and warm areas with moderately dense herbaceous vegetation, in lawns, limestones, clay and sandy soils. In the Alps, it is particularly common in the valleys, but can be found in good conditions up to 1000 meters above sea level.

== Biology ==
They mostly feed on legumes (Coronilla species, Lathyrus species) and other leguminous plants, such as alfalfa (Medicago sativa), birdsfoot trefoil (Lotus corniculatus), milkvetch (Astragalus), vetch (Vicia), Sainfoin (Onobrychis), broom (Genista) or restharrows (Ononis).

The species overwinters as larvae (in third or fourth instar) and develops in May or June into the adult insect. The adults can be observed from Summer until September. The oviposition occurs in midsummer.

Coptosoma scutellatum on Onobrychis

== Bibliography ==
- Ekkehard Wachmann, Albert Melber, Jürgen Deckert: Wanzen. Band 4: Pentatomomorpha II: Pentatomoidea: Cydnidae, Thyreocoridae, Plataspidae, Acanthosomatidae, Scutelleridae, Pentatomidae. Goecke & Evers, Keltern 2008, ISBN 978-3-937783-36-9, S. 28.
- Kment P. (2013): Preliminary check-list of the Heteroptera of Czech Republic
- Vilimova J., 2004 - Family Plataspididae - Catalogue of the Heteroptera of the Palaearctic Region
- Ekkehard Wachmann: Wanzen beobachten – kennenlernen. Neumann-Neudamm, Melsungen 1989, ISBN 3-7888-0554-4, S. 72
- Ekkehard Wachmann:Wanzen beobachten – kennenlernen. Neumann-Neudamm, Melsungen 1989, ISBN 3-7888-0554-4.
- Frieder Sauer: Sauers Naturführer Wanzen und Zikaden nach Farbfotos erkannt. Fauna, Keltern 1996, ISBN 3-923010-12-5, S. 32.
