= Tarichea =

Scientific classification
- Kingdom: Animalia
- Phylum: Arthropoda
- Class: Insecta
- Order: Hemiptera
- Suborder: Heteroptera
- Infraorder: Pentatomomorpha
- Superfamily: Pentatomoidea
- Family: Plataspidae
- Genus: Tarichea; Stål, 1865
- Species: T. chinensis

Binomial name
- Tarichea chinensis (Dallas, 1851)

Synonyms
- Plataspis chinensis Dallas, 1851

Species of shield bug

Tarichea is a genus of shield bugs belonging to the family Plataspidae, containing the single species, T. chinensis.
