= Synona melanaria =

Scientific classification
- Kingdom: Animalia
- Phylum: Arthropoda
- Clade: Pancrustacea
- Class: Insecta
- Order: Coleoptera
- Suborder: Polyphaga
- Infraorder: Cucujiformia
- Family: Coccinellidae
- Genus: Synona
- Species: S. melanaria

Binomial name
- Synona melanaria (Mulsant, 1850)

Synonyms
- Synia melanaria Mulsant, 1850; Coccinella cassidoides Montrouzier, 1855; Coelophora seminigra Weise, 1902; Harmonia anthracina Iablokoff-Khnzorian, 1982

Species of beetle

Synona melanaria is a species of beetle of the family Coccinellidae. It is found in Australia (Queensland, Northern Territory), the Solomon Islands, Papua New Guinea, Indonesia (Irian Jaya, Java) and Burma.

== Description ==
Adults reach a length of about 5.2–6.5 mm (0.20–0.26 in). They have a subcircular body, with the dorsum very hemispherical and convex. They are highly variable in appearance. Typically, the head is yellow and the pronotum black with yellow anterolateral areas. The elytra are black. Some specimens have a reddish-testaceous head and the pronotum is reddish-testaceous with a black marking. The scutellum and elytra are black. The ventral surface is yellowish.
