= Synona philippinensis =

Scientific classification
- Kingdom: Animalia
- Phylum: Arthropoda
- Clade: Pancrustacea
- Class: Insecta
- Order: Coleoptera
- Suborder: Polyphaga
- Infraorder: Cucujiformia
- Family: Coccinellidae
- Genus: Synona
- Species: S. philippinensis

Binomial name
- Synona philippinensis Poorani, Ślipiński & Booth, 2008

Species of beetle

Synona philippinensis is a species of beetle of the family Coccinellidae. It is found in the Philippines (Luzon).

== Description ==
Adults reach a length of about 5.3–6.4 mm (0.21–0.25 in). They have a round body, with the dorsum hemispherical and strongly convex. The head is black, with a yellow frons in males, while it is black in females. The anterolateral corners of the pronotum are yellow, while the rest of the dorsal surface is black. The ventral surface is mostly yellow.

== Etymology ==
The species is named after its type locality.
