= Fedora Legacy =

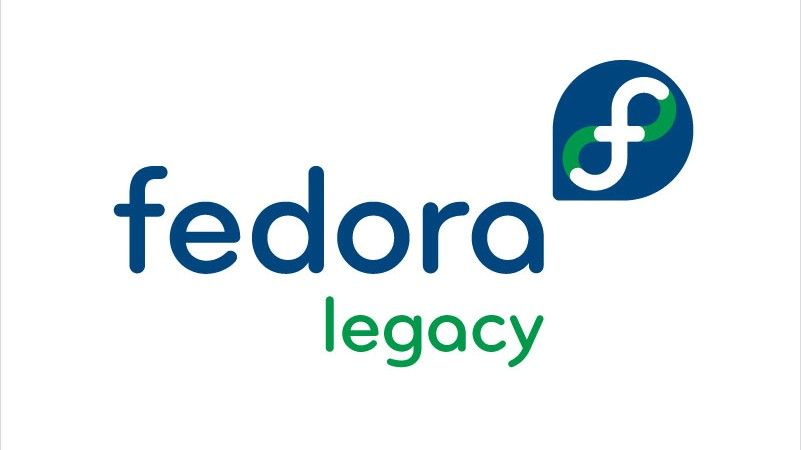
- Founder: Red Hat
- Type: Community
- Legal status: Discontinued
- Purpose: Free Software
- Website: fedoraproject.org/wiki/Archive:Legacy

Fedora Legacy was a community-supported, open-source software project to freely distribute patches for critical software bugs and vulnerabilities to users of older versions of the Red Hat Linux and Fedora Core Linux distributions, after the publisher, Red Hat, ceased support.

Jesse Keating and David Eisenstein, two of the Fedora Legacy software maintainers, announced the discontinuation of the project on 31 December 2006.

Fedora Legacy later cited the following as reasons for discontinuing the project: Not enough people contributing, testing, and deploying patches; not enough funds; waning interest in the project and new discussion about extending the software release life cycle of Fedora Core.

Just before the discontinuation, Fedora Legacy was providing updates for Red Hat Linux versions 7.3 and 9, and Fedora Core 3 and 4. They ceased support for Fedora Core 1 and 2 when Red Hat published Fedora Core 6 Test 2. Earlier in 2006, Fedora Legacy announced their intention to provide updates for Red Hat 7.3 and 9 by the end of the year, and then to focus on Fedora Core 3 and 4.

== See also ==
- Long-term support
