= Cronion =

Scientific classification
- Kingdom: Animalia
- Phylum: Arthropoda
- Class: Insecta
- Order: Hemiptera
- Suborder: Heteroptera
- Infraorder: Pentatomomorpha
- Superfamily: Pentatomoidea
- Family: Plataspidae
- Genus: Cronion; Bergroth, 1891
- Species: C. malayanus

Binomial name
- Cronion malayanus (Vollenhoven, 1865)

Synonyms
- Poseidon Vollenhoven, 1865 (preoccupied); Triodocoris Miller, 1955

Species of shield bug

Cronion is a genus of shield bugs belonging to the family Plataspidae, containing the single species, C. malayanus.
