= Tetrisia =

Scientific classification
- Kingdom: Animalia
- Phylum: Arthropoda
- Class: Insecta
- Order: Hemiptera
- Suborder: Heteroptera
- Infraorder: Pentatomomorpha
- Superfamily: Pentatomoidea
- Family: Plataspidae
- Genus: Tetrisia; Walker, 1867

Synonyms
- Dolichisme Kirkaldy, 1904

Genus of true bugs

Tetrisia is a genus of shield bugs belonging to the family Plataspidae. The same genus name was published as a new moth genus, Tetrisia, four months later by the same author, making the latter an invalid junior homonym, in need of formal replacement.

== Species ==
- Tetrisia bruchoides Walker, 1867
- Tetrisia vacca Webb, 2004
