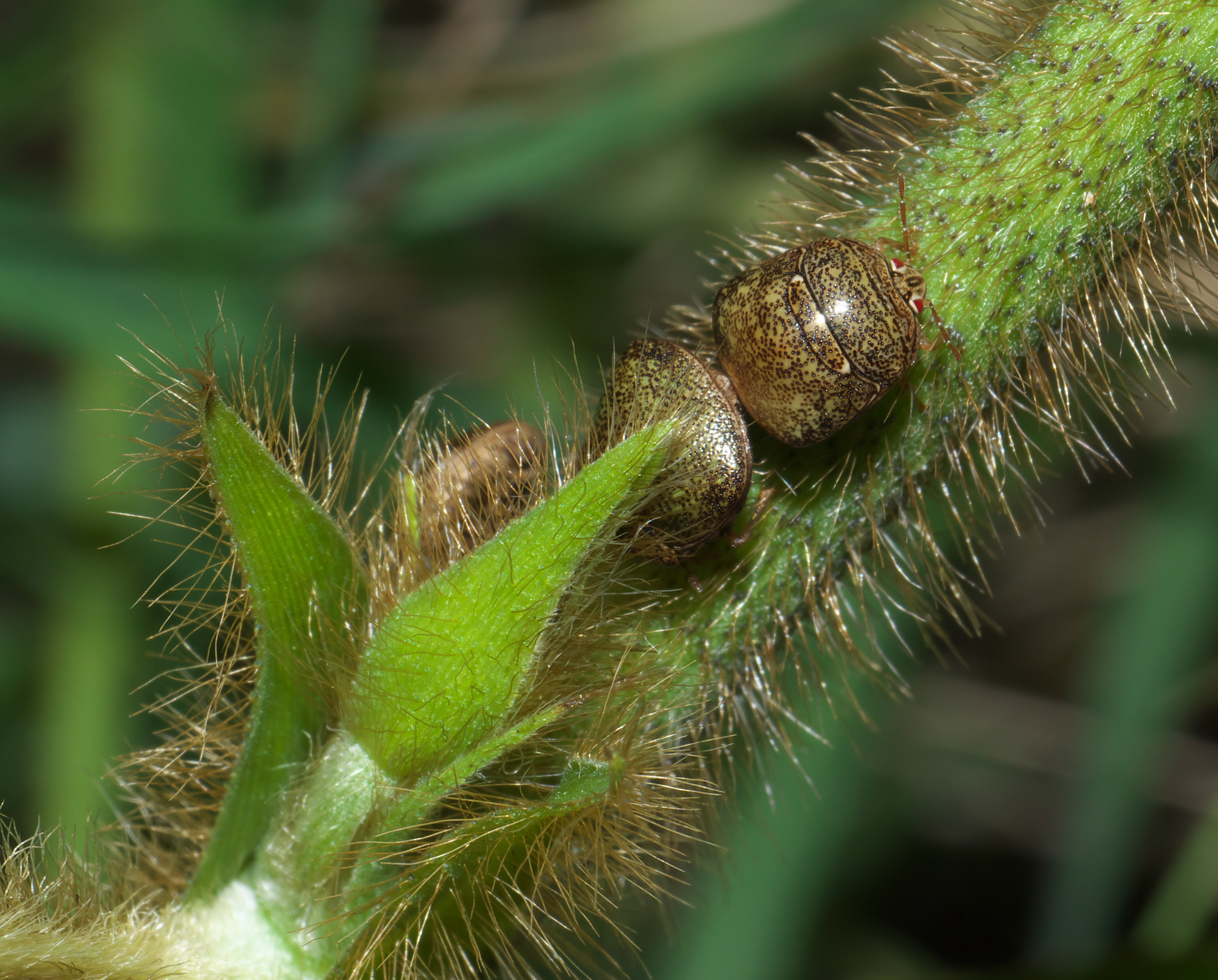
- Megacopta cribraria

Scientific classification
- Kingdom: Animalia
- Phylum: Arthropoda
- Class: Insecta
- Order: Hemiptera
- Suborder: Heteroptera
- Infraorder: Pentatomomorpha
- Superfamily: Pentatomoidea
- Family: Plataspidae
- Genus: Megacopta; Hsiao & Jen, 1977

= Megacopta =

Genus of true bugs

Megacopta is a genus of true bugs in the family Plataspidae.

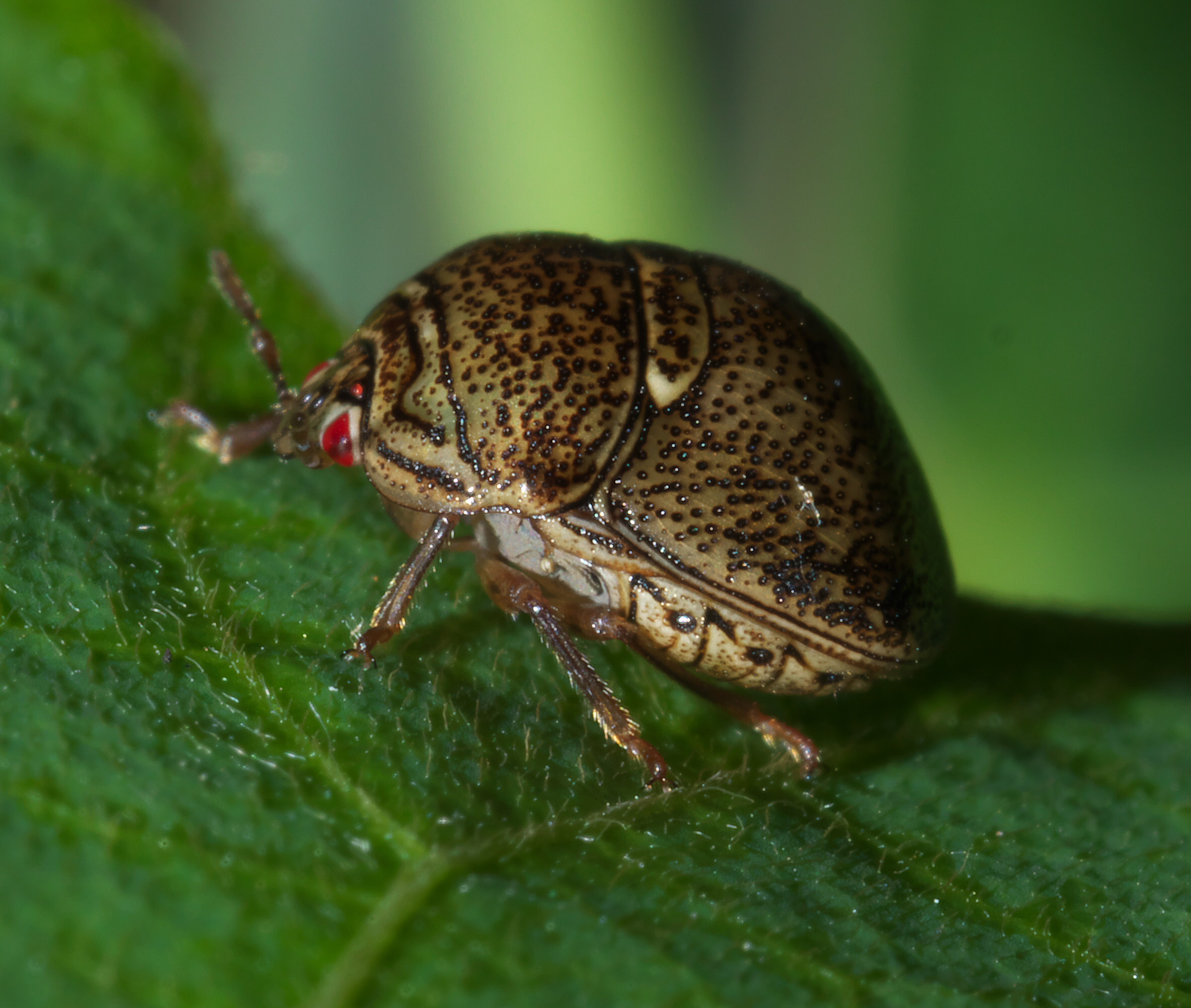
Megacopta cribraria

== Species ==
- Megacopta bicolor Hsiao & Jen 1977
- Megacopta bituminata (Montandon 1897)
- Megacopta breviceps (Horváth 1879)
- Megacopta caliginosa (Montandon, 1893)
- Megacopta callosa (Yang, 1934)
- Megacopta centronubila (Yang, 1934)
- Megacopta centrosignata (Yang, 1934)
- Megacopta cribraria (Fabricius, 1798) (kudzu bug)
- Megacopta cribriella Hsiao & Jen, 1977
- Megacopta cycloceps Hsiao & Jen, 1977
- Megacopta dinghushana Chen, 1989
- Megacopta distanti (Montandon, 1893)
- Megacopta fimbriata (Distant, 1887)
- Megacopta fimbrilla Li, 1981
- Megacopta horvathi (Montandon, 1894)
- Megacopta hui (Yang, 1934)
- Megacopta laeviventris Hsiao & Jen, 1977
- Megacopta liniola Hsiao & Jen, 1977
- Megacopta lobata (Walker, 1867)
- Megacopta longruiana Ren, 2000
- Megacopta punctatissima (Montandon, 1894)(Japanese common plataspid stinkbug)
- Megacopta rotunda Hsiao & Jen, 1977
- Megacopta subsolitaris (Yang, 1934)
- Megacopta tubercula Hsiao & Jen, 1977
- Megacopta verrucosa (Montandon, 1897)
- Megacopta w-nigrum (Varshney, 1965)

== Symbionts ==
Bacterial symbionts are necessary for Megacopta bugs to digest soybean plant material.
