= Oscula =

Scientific classification
- Kingdom: Animalia
- Phylum: Arthropoda
- Class: Insecta
- Order: Hemiptera
- Suborder: Heteroptera
- Infraorder: Pentatomomorpha
- Superfamily: Pentatomoidea
- Family: Plataspidae
- Genus: Oscula; Bergroth, 1891
- Species: O. flavescens

Binomial name
- Oscula flavescens (Stål, 1870)

Synonyms
- Osca Stål, 1870 (1871) (preoccupied)

Species of shield bug

Oscula is a genus of shield bugs belonging to the family Plataspidae, containing the single species, O. flavescens.
