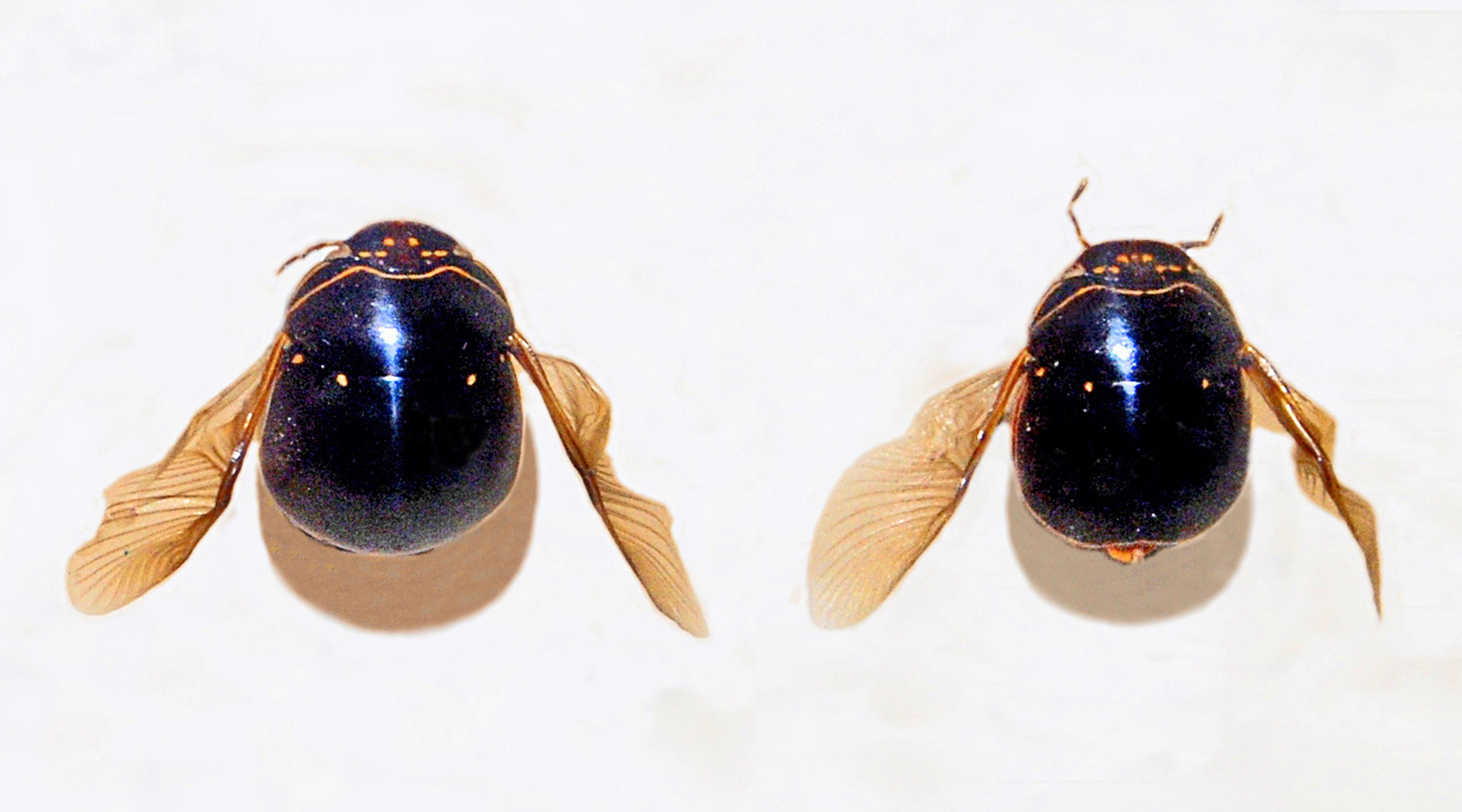
- Brachyplatys punctipes

Scientific classification
- Kingdom: Animalia
- Phylum: Arthropoda
- Class: Insecta
- Order: Hemiptera
- Suborder: Heteroptera
- Infraorder: Pentatomomorpha
- Superfamily: Pentatomoidea
- Family: Plataspidae
- Genus: Brachyplatys; Boisduval, 1835

Synonyms
- Plataspis Westwood, 1837; Platycephala Laporte, 1833

= Brachyplatys =

Genus of true bugs

Brachyplatys is a genus of shield bugs belonging to the family Plataspidae.

== Species ==
- Brachyplatys biroi Montandon, 1900
- Brachyplatys caeruleatus Montandon, 1896
- Brachyplatys capito Montandon, 1894
- Brachyplatys funebris Distant, 1901
- Brachyplatys pacifica Dallas, 1851
- Brachyplatys punctipes Montandon, 1894
- Brachyplatys subaeneus (Westwood, 1837)
- Brachyplatys vahlii (Fabricius, 1787)
