= Kudzu.com =

Local directory service

- Website type: Subsidiary
- Founded: June 2005
- Dissolved: November 2018
- Headquarters: Atlanta, GA, USA
- Founder: Tom Bates
- Industry: Business ratings and reviews / Local Search
- Services: Review site
- Parent: Cox Media Group
- Website: www.kudzu.com

Kudzu.com was an online directory that aggregated user reviews and ratings on local businesses, merchants, and service providers. Kudzu.com was established by Cox Enterprises in 2005, and later owned and operated by Cox Media Group. The site closed on November 30, 2018.

== History ==
Kudzu.com initially served the market of Atlanta, and expanded to Arizona, San Diego, and Las Vegas in the fall of 2006. In the fall of 2007, Kudzu.com expanded nationally, offering business information and the ability for customers to rate and review businesses in all markets across the United States.

In August 2010, Kudzu.com partnered with HGTV, where HGTV's videos and content were added to Kudzu.com, and the ability to search Kudzu.com's listings was added to several HGTV websites. The partnership ended at the end of 2011.

Shortly thereafter, Kudzu became part of Cox Media Group under The Atlanta Journal-Constitution newspaper, and returned its focus to Atlanta. In 2013, Kudzu launched a Digital Solutions product line to help online businesses improve their SEO and optimize their web presence.

== Features ==
Kudzu.com's database included structured profiles to describe what the companies offer. Profiles contained marketing descriptions, photographs of work performed, videos, coupons, professional affiliations, and credentials. It also lets consumers provide user-generated reviews and ratings of local businesses. Site visitors interested in finding a service provider could search or browse profiles by service rendered, specialty, geographic location, and “star” rating, among other fields, to find businesses for their particular home and personal needs.

The site focused on small businesses and home-owners. Merchants that registered with Kudzu.com had the option of replying to negative reviews.

Some of Kudzu.com's features included:

- Merchant written profiles
- Lists of services, brands, styles, etc.
- Multiple reviews per business
- Mapping capabilities
- Star ratings and attribute scoring (for Quality, Service, and Price)
- Merchant-uploaded videos
- Merchant-uploaded photos
- Printable online coupons
- “Virtual House”, where users could click on parts of the house, room-by-room, to get appropriate directory listings. Clicking on a fish aquarium in the master bedroom, for instance, led to listings for pet stores. Clicking on the rug led to listings for maid services.
