= Kudzu (computer daemon) =

Computer hardware probing program

Kudzu is a computer hardware probing program (written by Red Hat) which relies on a library of hardware device information. It is not to be confused with kudzu, a vine-like plant.

== Description ==
When the computer boots, kudzu detects changes in the running system's hardware configuration, if any, and activates the newly detected hardware (or removal of hardware). kudzu only runs at boot time, and then exits. There is no performance penalty during normal operation. (Since Fedora release 9, kudzu is superseded by HAL) kudzu detects and configures new and/or changed hardware on a system.

When started, kudzu detects the current hardware, and checks it against a database stored in /etc/sysconfig/hwconf, if one exists. It then determines if any hardware has been added or removed from the system. If so, it gives the users the opportunity to configure any added hardware, and unconfigure any removed hardware. It then updates the database in /etc/sysconfig/hwconf. If no previous database exists, kudzu attempts to determine what devices have already been configured, by looking at /etc/modprobe.conf, /etc/sysconfig/network-scripts/, and /etc/X11/xorg.conf.

== Options usage ==
—help, -?

Print help information.

-q, --quiet

Run 'quietly'; do only configuration that doesn't require user input.

-s, --safe

Do only 'safe' probes that won't disturb hardware. Currently, this disables the serial probe, the DDC monitor probe, and the PS/2 probe.

-t, --timeout [seconds]

This sets the timeout for the initial dialog. If no key is pressed before the timeout elapses, kudzu exits, and /etc/sysconfig/hwconf is not updated.

-k, --kernel [version]

When determining whether a module exists, use the specified kernel version. (If this is not set, it defaults to the current kernel version.) Do not specify suffixes such as 'smp' or 'summit'; these are automatically searched.

-b, --bus [bus]

Only probe on the specified bus.

-c, --class [class]

Only probe for the specified class.

-f, --file [file]

Read hardware probe info from file file and do not do an actual probe.

-p, --probe

Print probe information to the screen, and do not actually configure or unconfigure any devices.

== Files ==
/etc/sysconfig/hwconf

Listing of current installed hardware.

/etc/sysconfig/kudzu

Configuration for the boot-time hardware probe. Set 'SAFE' to something other than 'no' to force only safe probes.

/etc/modprobe.conf

Module configuration file.

/etc/sysconfig/network-scripts/ifcfg-*

Network interface configuration files.

== Bugs ==
The serial probe will disturb any currently in-use devices, and returns odd results if used on machines acting as serial consoles. On some older graphics cards, the DDC probe can do strange things.

Running kudzu to configure network adapters post-boot after the network has started may have unintended results.
