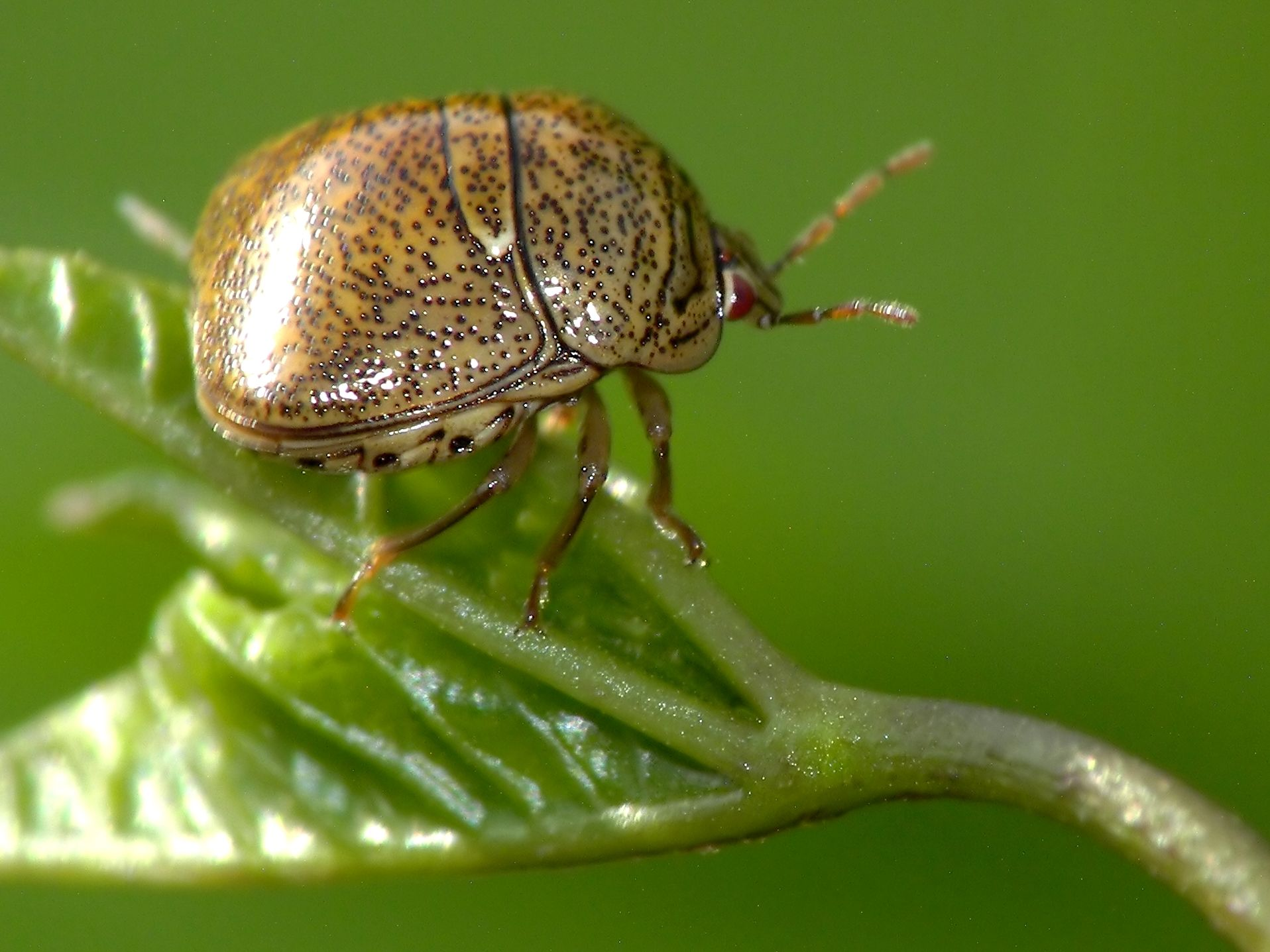

Scientific classification
- Kingdom: Animalia
- Phylum: Arthropoda
- Clade: Pancrustacea
- Class: Insecta
- Order: Hemiptera
- Suborder: Heteroptera
- Infraorder: Pentatomomorpha
- Superfamily: Pentatomoidea
- Family: Plataspidae
- Genus: Megacopta
- Species: M. cribraria

Binomial name
- Megacopta cribraria (Fabricius, 1798)

Synonyms
- Homotypic: Cimex cribraria Fabricius, 1798; Tetyra cribraria (Fabricius, 1798); Thyreocoris cribrarius (Fabricius, 1798); Coptosoma cribrarium (Fabricius, 1798); Heterotypic: Coptosoma xanthochlora Walker 1867; Megacopta punctatissima (Montandon, 1894)

= Megacopta cribraria =

Pest of all beans, kudzu, other legumes

Distribution of Megacopta cribraria in the USA (2009–2012)

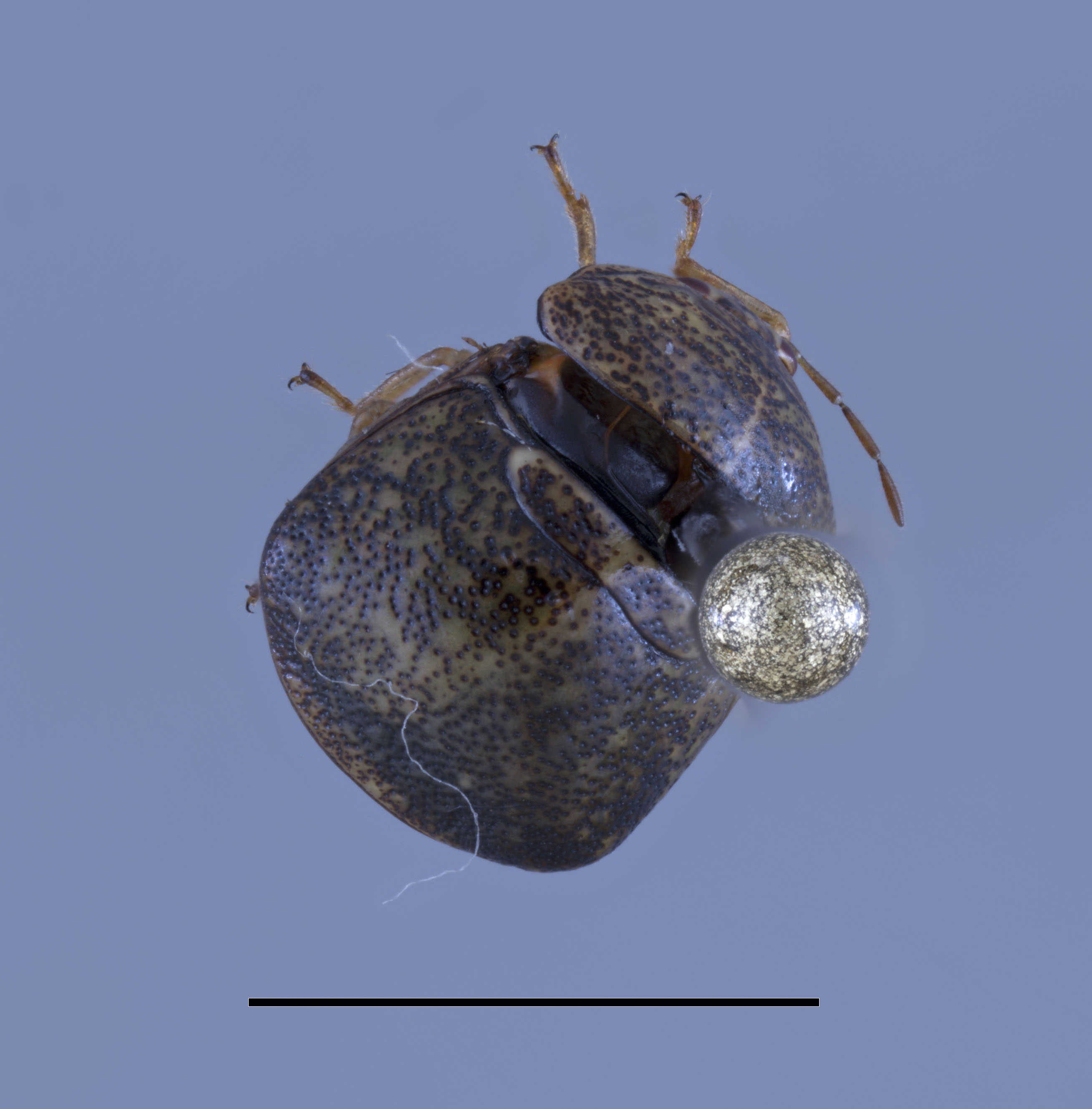
Figure 1. Megacopta cribraria (Fabricius 1798) collected in GA, Baldwin CO on 21 Sept 2024 by S. Mears

Megacopta cribraria, also called the bean plataspid, kudzu bug, globular stink bug and lablab bug, is a shield bug native to India and China, where it is an agricultural pest of lablab beans and other legumes. The bug, while harmless to houseplants and people, often enters houses. It is attracted to white surfaces such as the walls of houses or white vehicles, because of the high reflectance of the white surfaces as it relates to the bugs' simple eyes. As a defense mechanism, they emit a foul-smelling pheromone that also acts as a congregation pheromone. Aside from smelling foul, the liquid also creates a burning sensation and sometimes leaves a red welt on bare skin. It is similar to other Plataspidae in having a somewhat unusual symbiotic relationship with its gut bacteria. Before laying eggs, females deposit particles containing the symbiont, which are then eaten by newly hatched nymphs under natural conditions. Nymphs experimentally deprived of access to the symbiont exhibited slower growth, smaller body sizes and higher mortality.

Megacopta punctatissima, the Japanese common stinkbug, is a name applied to Japanese populations of M. cribraria. It has a gut bacteria that allows it to consume crops such as soybean plants. The two used to be treated as distinct species, but phylogenetic work has found the two to be not distinct. What is called M. cribraria in the United States likely descends from a population of "M. punctatissima" from Kyushu, Japan. The Japanese (JA) population is closest to the East Asian continental (EAC) population. The two diverged 0.71 Mya (million years ago), when the East China Sea land bridge became submerged. The EAC population branched off from the Southeast Asian (SEA) population 1.34 Mya.

The bean plataspid gives off an offensive odor when touched, squashed, or poked. Hosted by wisteria, green beans, and other legumes, the insect sucks juice from the stems of soybean plants and reduces crop yield. However, when the insect infests kudzu, another invasive species, it appreciably reduces the growth of that plant.

== Anatomy ==
Like other plataspid stinkbugs, this bug has a peculiar anatomy where the digestive tract is disconnected midway. The gut is normally organized in nymphs, but the midgut becomes disconnected during development. The anterior midgut is where food digestion occurs and the posterior midgut becomes enlarged as an organ specialized for holding symbiotic bacteria. Waste is excreted through the Malpighian tubules into the hindgut.

== Ecology ==
In 2011 in its invasive range in Georgia, M. cribraria's aggregation score - Taylor's Power Law/Taylor's Law b - had an extremely high slope for adults. The b_{adults} was 3.27 ± 0.115 and b_{adults} > b_{nymphs} > b_{eggs}. By the next year - and continuing at least into 2013 - the adult score was much lower and the order was reversed, with b_{eggs} > b_{nymphs} > b_{adults}.

=== Hosts ===
Populations harboring "M. punctatissima"-type microbiomes (Japan; North American invasive) are able to infest Glycine max (soybean) and a few other crop species. North American populations also feed on kudzu, which acts as a major food source and reservoir.

Various populations are able to feed on Cajanus cajan (pigeon pea), Vigna unguiculata (cowpea), Lablab purpureus (lablab), Cyamopsis tetragonoloba (guar), and Sesbania bispinosa (danchi).

=== Microbiome ===
Females are found by Hosokawa et al. (2008) to produce pellets with their own microbiome species and deposit them near their eggs. Larvae then search for and consume these. If these pellets are absent they will search more than those successfully finding pellets, suggesting that microbiome provision is indeed the purpose of this entire process and this is not accidental.

The bugs carry Wolbachia and "Ca. Ishikawella" symbioants. Some also carry Arsenophonus.

==== Ishikawella ====
M. cribraria lives in symbiosis with a γ-proteobacterium called "Candidatus Ishikawella capsulata". (Note: Genus "Candidatus Ishikawella". Authors proposed name as "Candidatus Ishikawaella capsulata", which is treated by Oren (and on LPSN) as an inaccurate spelling.) This bacterium lives in the enlarged posterior midgut of the insect without entering insect cells.

Hosokawa et al. (2007) finds "M. punctatissima" and not M. cribraria to be naturally able to infest soybean, but that this is solely due to Ishikawaella and can be experimentally induced in M. cribraria by giving it "M. punctatissima"'s symbiont. This sharp difference in function is produced by a very small genetic difference: Hosokawa et al. (2007) finds their 16S ribosomal RNAs to be 99.9% identical and more recent phylogenetic work finds them to be simply the same species.

Brown et al. (2014) compared the genomes of Ca. Ishikawella recovered from the bug's eastern North American invasive (NAi) range and found very little variation in their genomes. They carried symbioants very similar to the "M. punctatissima" of Japan, with only 47 fixed differences and one amino acid change. They concluded that the bug must have arrived with a symbioant that gives it the ability to feed on soybean, without needing any switch. This conclusion was supported by phylogenetic work finding that the NAi population to be descended from the JA population.

The Ishikawella strains carried by the insect has co-evolved with its host as it radiated from SEA, to EAC, and to JA. Various Ishikawella strains also colonize the guts of other Megacopta species and various Brachyplatys species.

== Southeastern United States ==
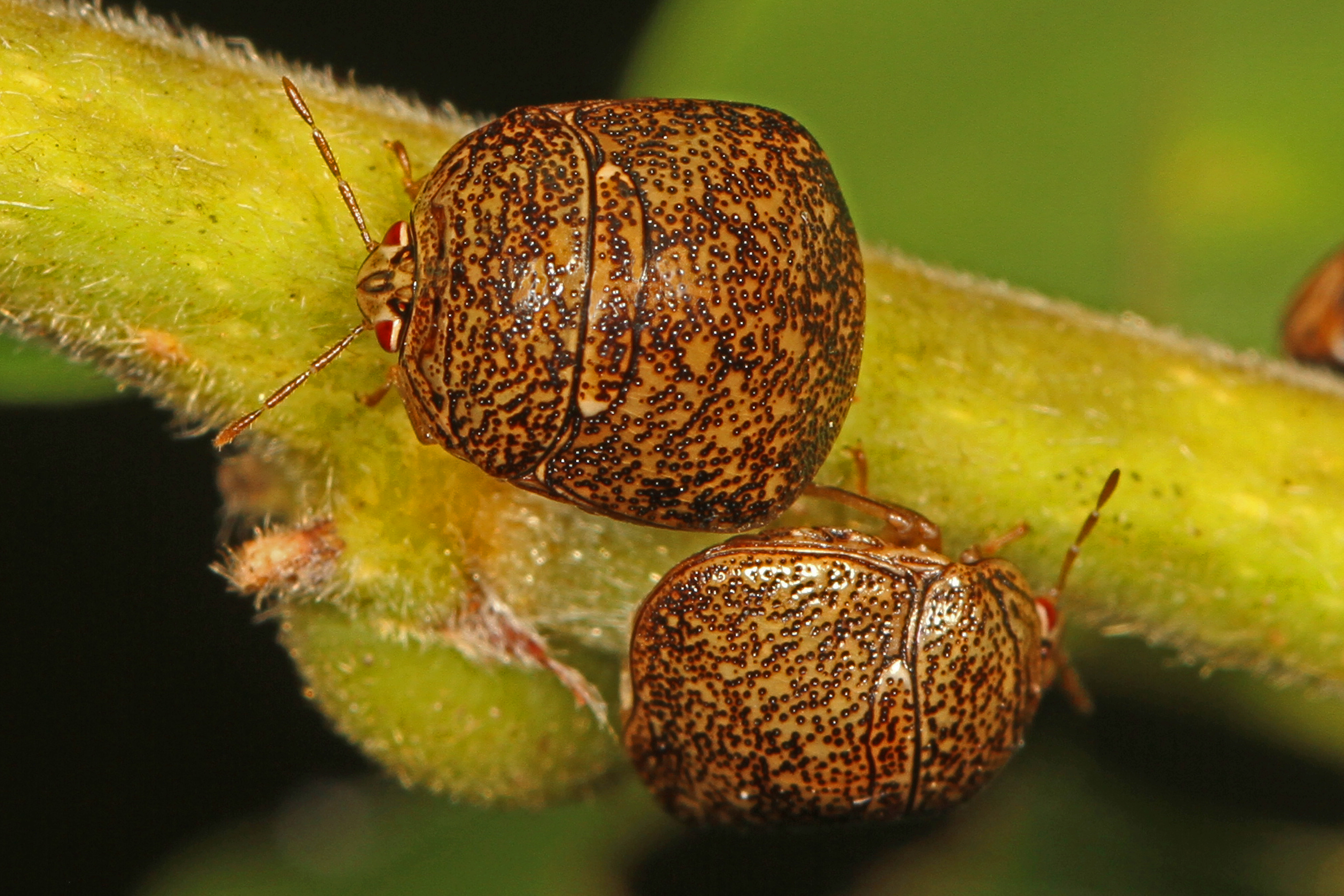
Santee National Wildlife Refuge, SC, USA

In the Southeastern United States, M. cribraria is an invasive species, and was first noticed in northeastern Georgia in 2009. As of 2012, it was spreading rapidly into the surrounding states of Alabama, Florida, North Carolina, South Carolina, Tennessee, and Virginia. It has recently begun to invade Maryland and Mississippi, as well. In 2017, M. cribraria was observed in Texas.

The bug causes problems not only for agricultural operations, but is also a major nuisance pest for residents. It "gathers in huge numbers in houses or other structures, seeking shelters in autumn." When disturbed it gives out an unpleasant smell. It also "produces a yellow substance when crushed that can stain cloth, wood and other surfaces." It is also reported to occasionally cause skin irritation.

== Current research ==
Universities and corporations throughout the Southeastern United States have begun research into alternative means of dealing with the kudzu bug. Universities in Georgia, South Carolina, and North Carolina, such as North Carolina State University and Georgia State University, have produced publications since 2011 until 2014 regarding M. cribraria pest management. One recent work demonstrates that the kudzu bug's diet in Alabama is broader than originally believed.

In theory the complete dependence of the pest upon the symbiont for pest phenotype recommends an easy control method: Deliberately provide Ishikawaella which is defective on G. max. Even better this would then be transmitted vertically. However, because the effective symbiont is also already present in the target population, there is no reason to think that the defective symbiont would overwhelm or even persist alongside the pest enabling symbiont.
