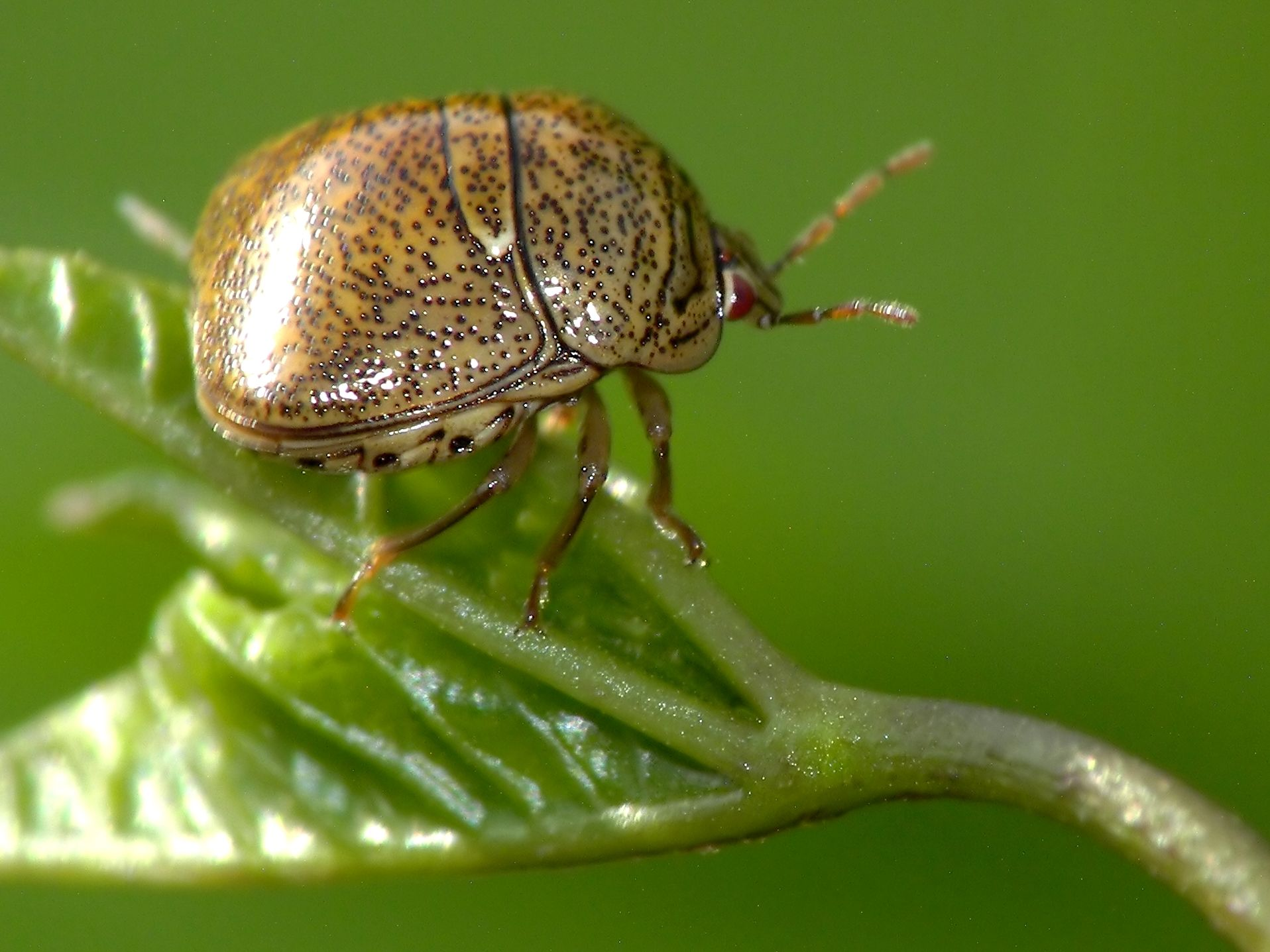
- Megacopta cribraria

Scientific classification
- Kingdom: Animalia
- Phylum: Arthropoda
- Class: Insecta
- Order: Hemiptera
- Suborder: Heteroptera
- Infraorder: Pentatomomorpha
- Superfamily: Pentatomoidea
- Family: Plataspidae; Dallas, 1851

Genera
- > 60 genera

= Plataspidae =

Family of true bugs

Plataspidae (emended by some later authors as "Plataspididae", in violation of ICZN Code Article 29.5) are a family of shield bugs native to the Old World. They are a family of hemipteran insects (true bugs) of the suborder Heteroptera (typical bugs).

== Genera ==
- Aphanopneuma
- Arefbea
- Bozius
- Brachyplatys
- Calacta
- Cantharodes
- Capuronia
- Catabrachyplatys
- Caternaultiella
- Ceratocoris
- Chinacoris
- Chinanops
- Codronchus
- Coptosoma
- Coptosomoides
- Cratoplatys
- Cronion
- Elapheozygum
- Emparka
- Erythrosomaspis
- Fieberisca
- Glarocoris
- Handlirschiella
- Hemitrochostoma
- Heterocrates
- Isoplatys
- Kuhlgatzia
- Libyaspis
- Livingstonisca
- Madegaschia
- Megacopta
- Merinjakia
- Montandoneus
- Montandonistella
- Neobozius
- Neocratoplatys
- Neotiarocoris
- Niamia
- Oncylaspis
- Oscula
- Paracopta
- Pelioderma
- Phyllomegacopta
- Ponsila
- Ponsilasia
- Probaenops
- Pseudoponsila
- Psocotoma
- Schizometopus
- Scleropelta
- Severiniella
- Spathocrates
- Tarichea
- Tetrisia
- Teuthocoris
- Thyreoprana
- Tiarocoris
- Tropidotylus
- Vetora
- Vigetus

== Biology ==
These bugs are phytophagous, polyphagous or oligophagous, mainly associated with the Fabaceae, but can also feed on plants of other families. Some may feed on fungi.

They harbor microorganisms in their digestive tract, specific to each host species, living in symbiosis with it.

They are gregarious and can be found in large groups.

Social behaviors have been observed in Libyaspis : the adults, well protected by their pronotum and their scutellum covering the entire abdomen, group together at the base of the branches in which the larvae develop, thus preventing the access of predatory ladybug larvae.

Little is known about their biology.

== Gallery ==
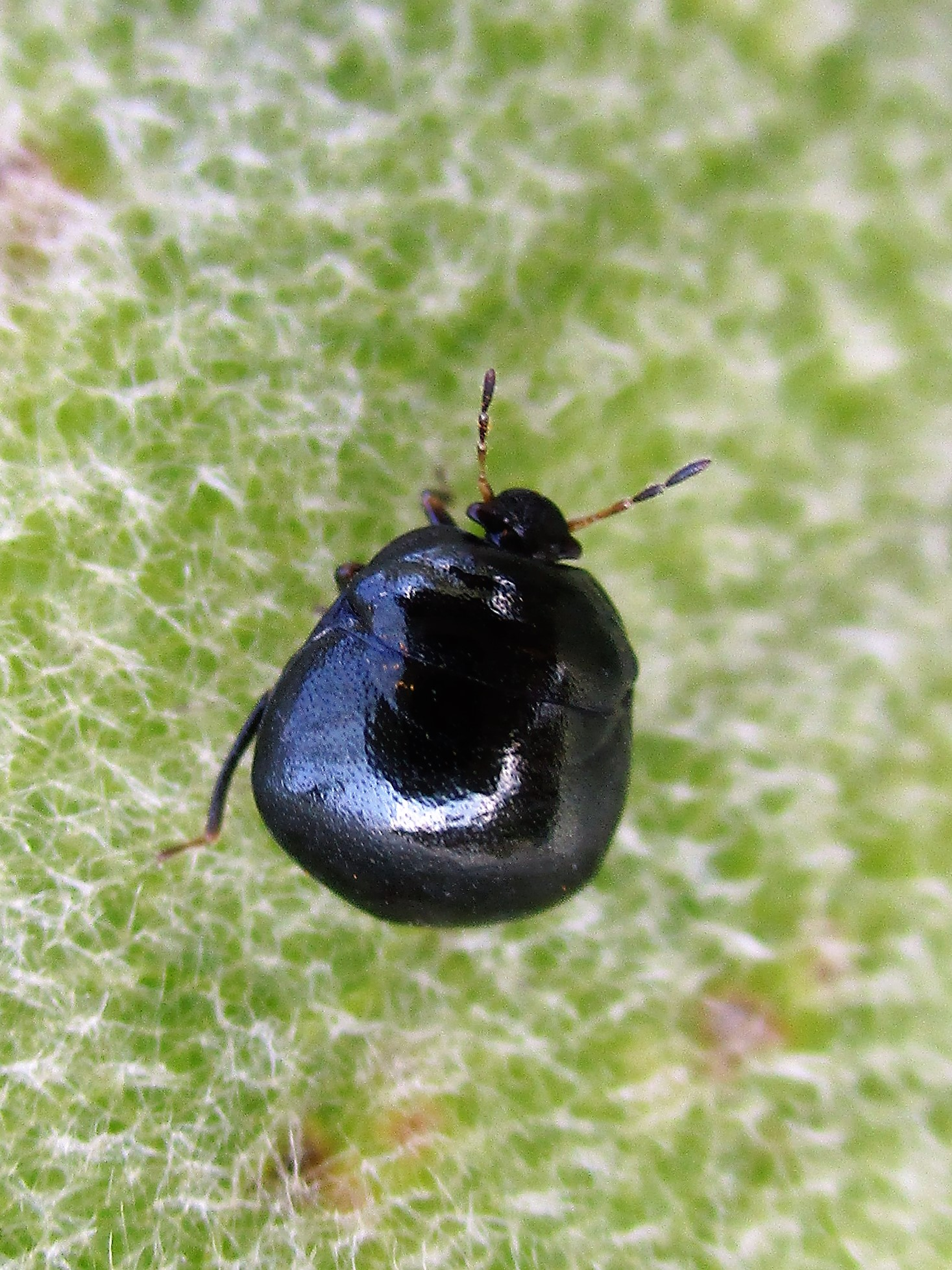
Coptosoma scutellatum in Europe

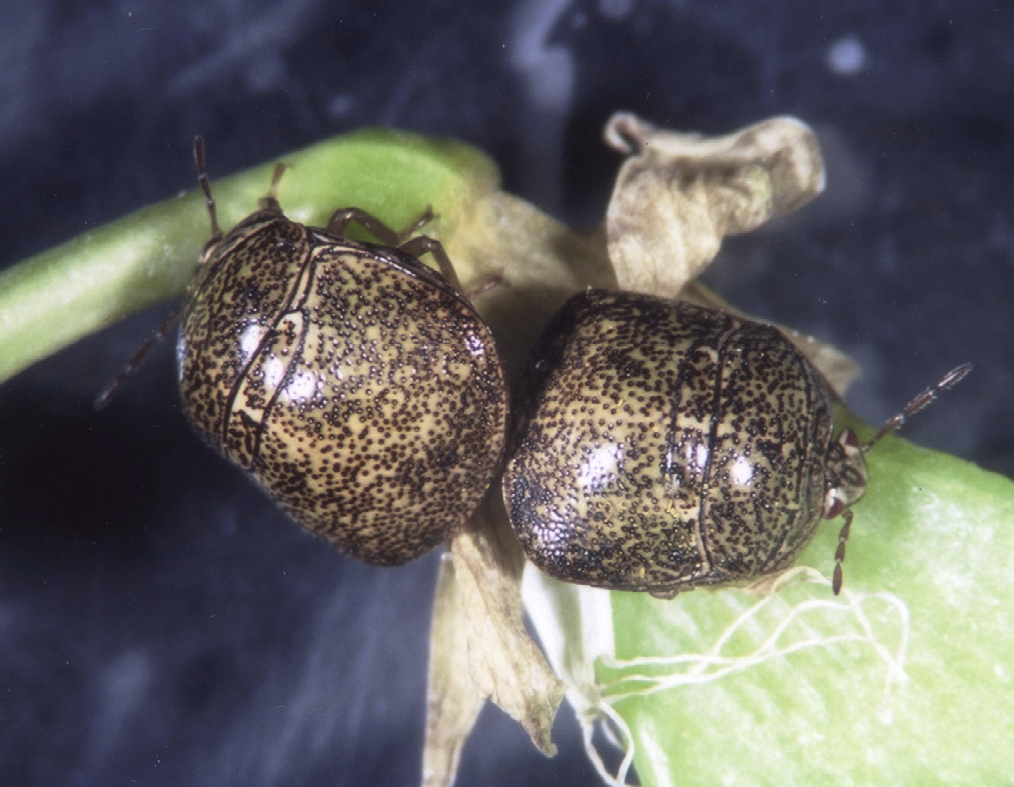
Megacopta punctatissima in Asia

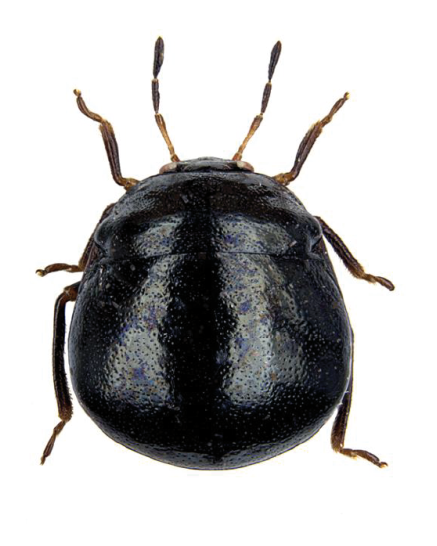
Coptosoma scutellatum

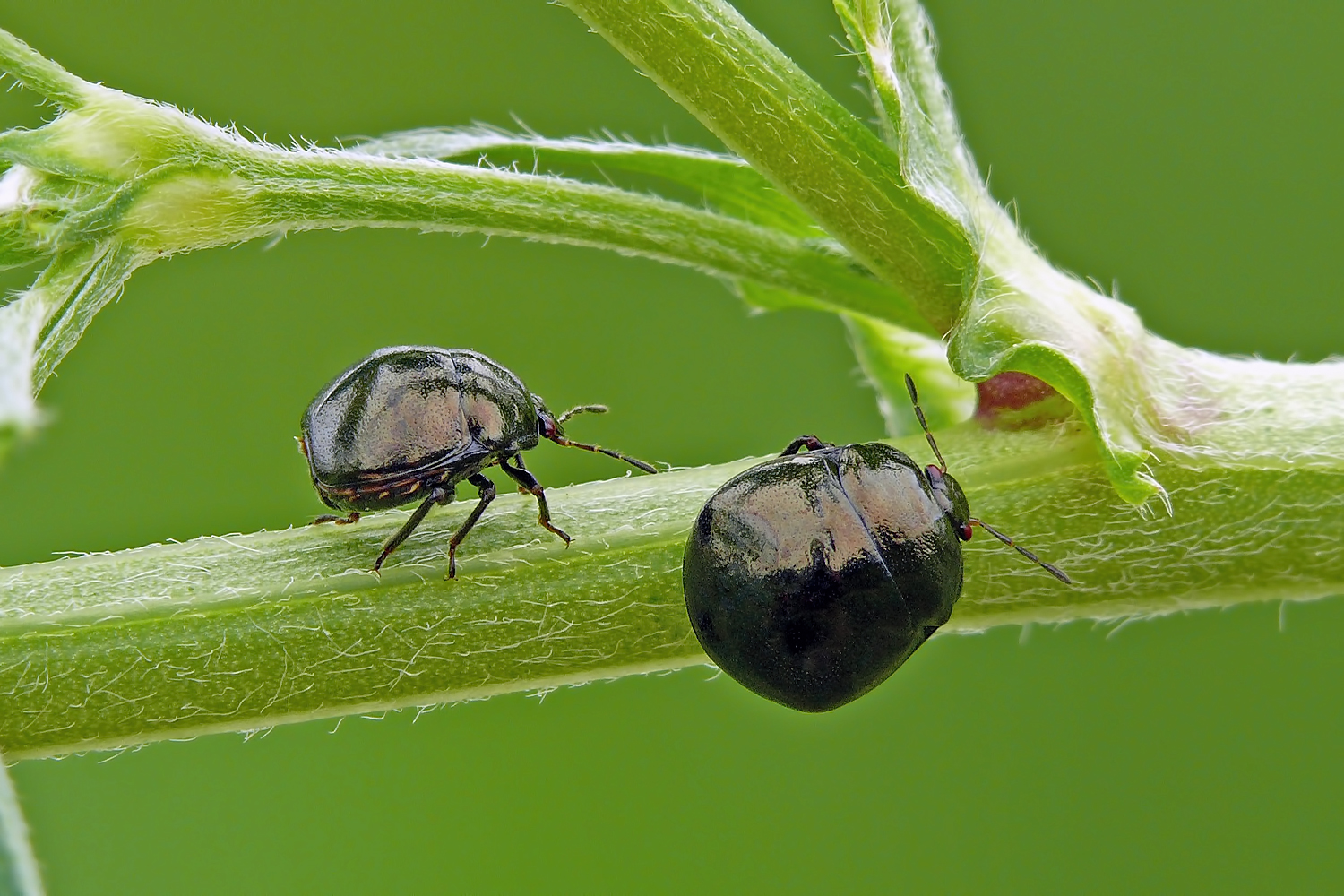
Coptosoma scutellatum in Lithuania

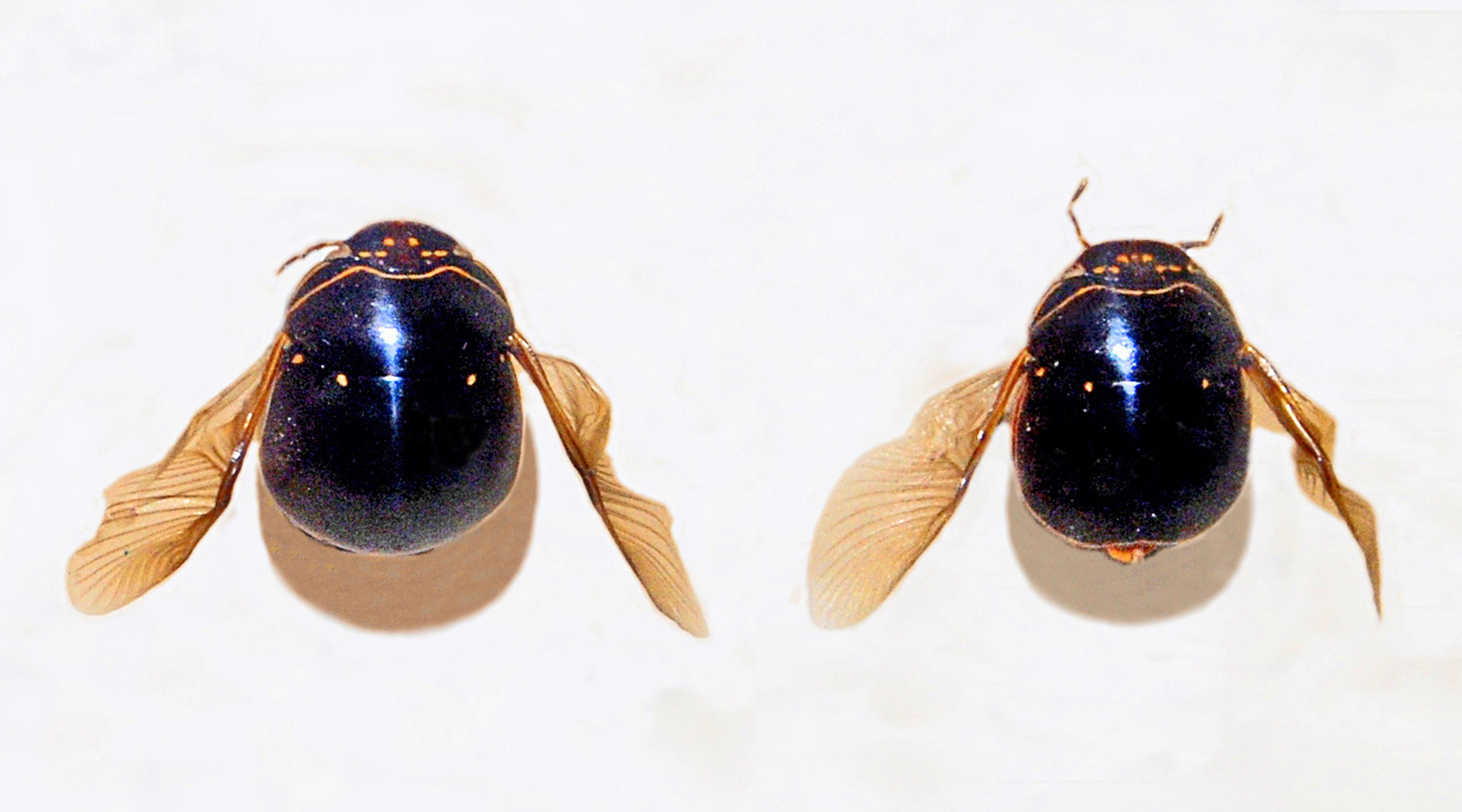
Brachyplatys punctipes

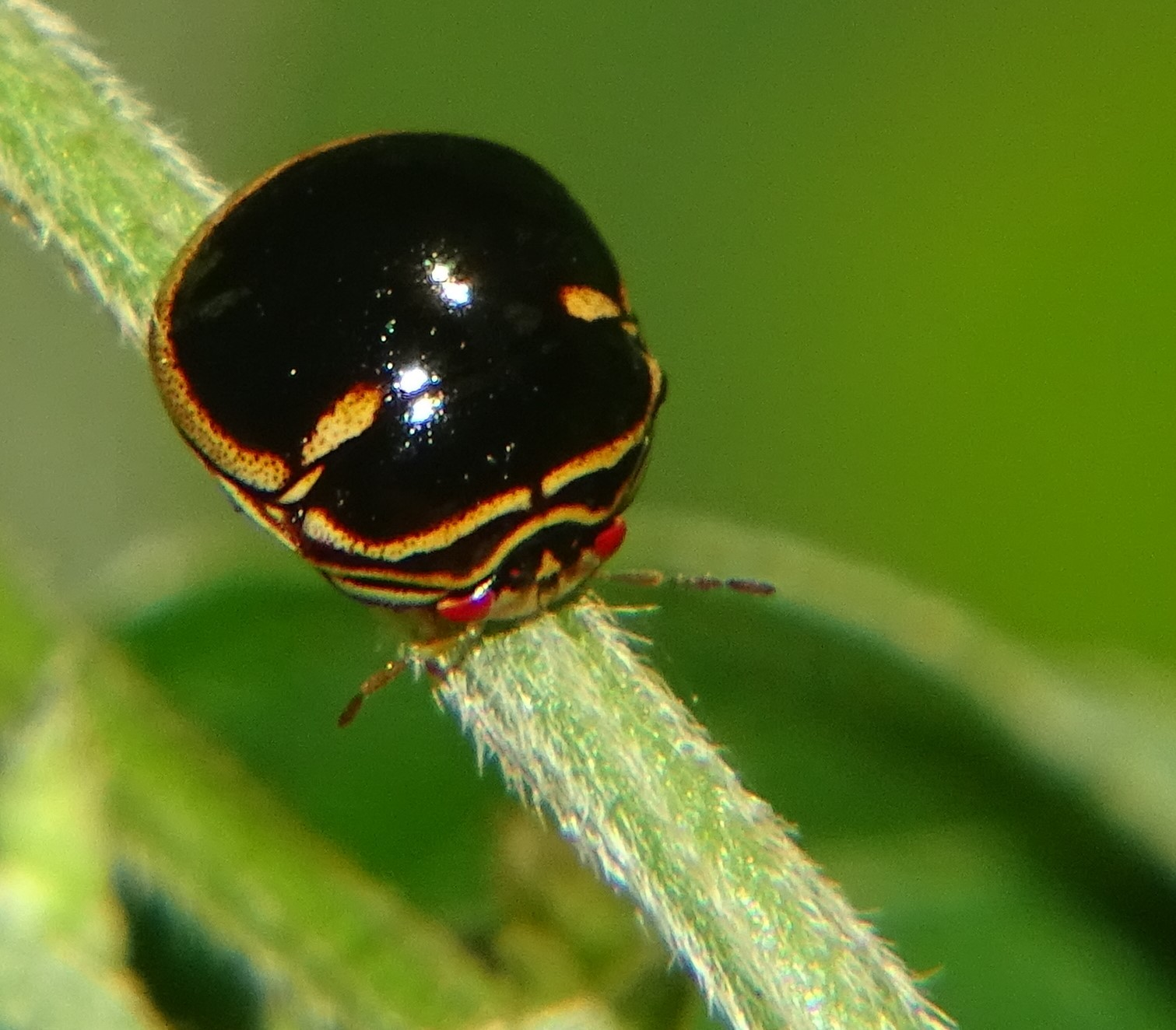
Coptosoma xanthogramma

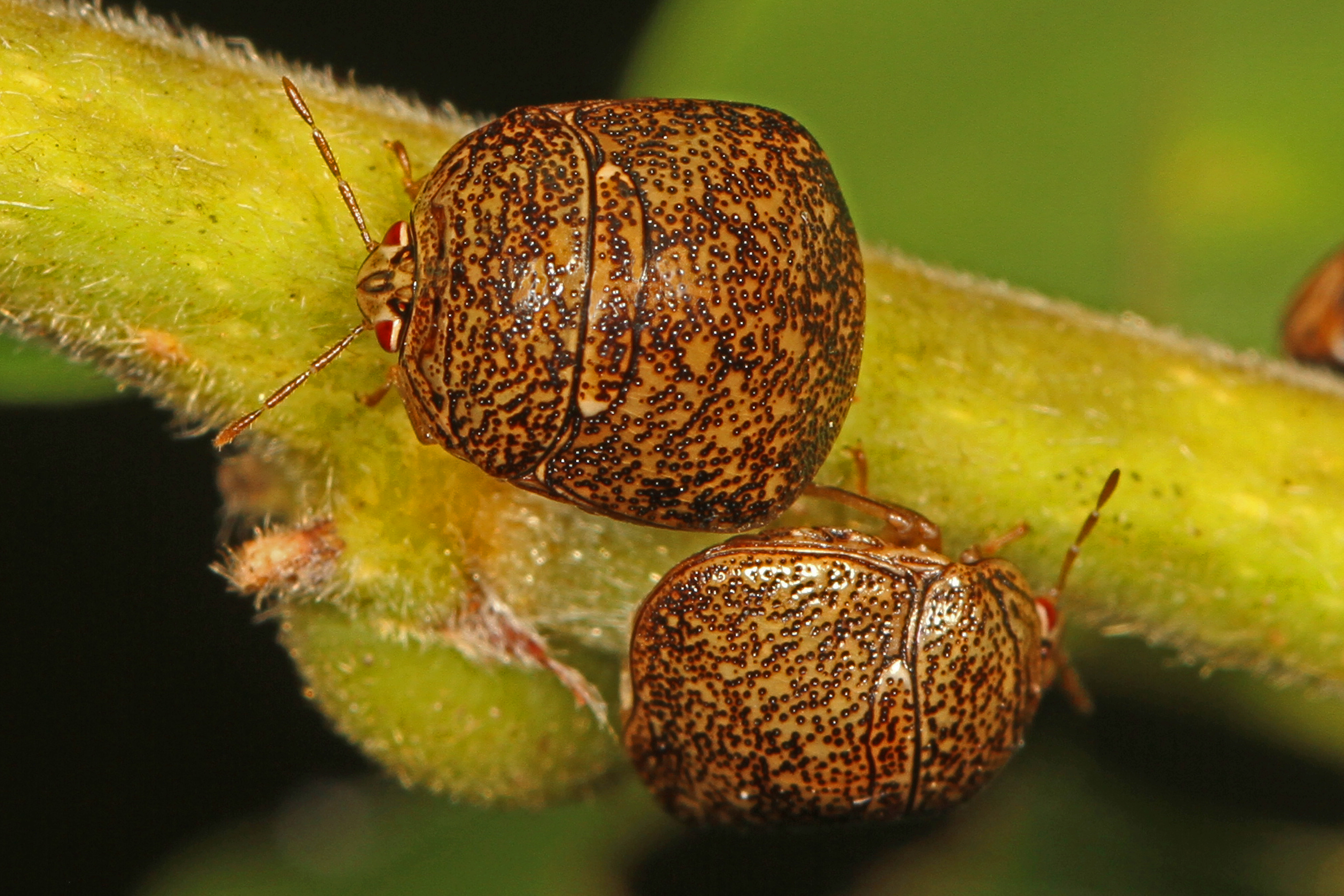
Megacopta cribraria in Carolina

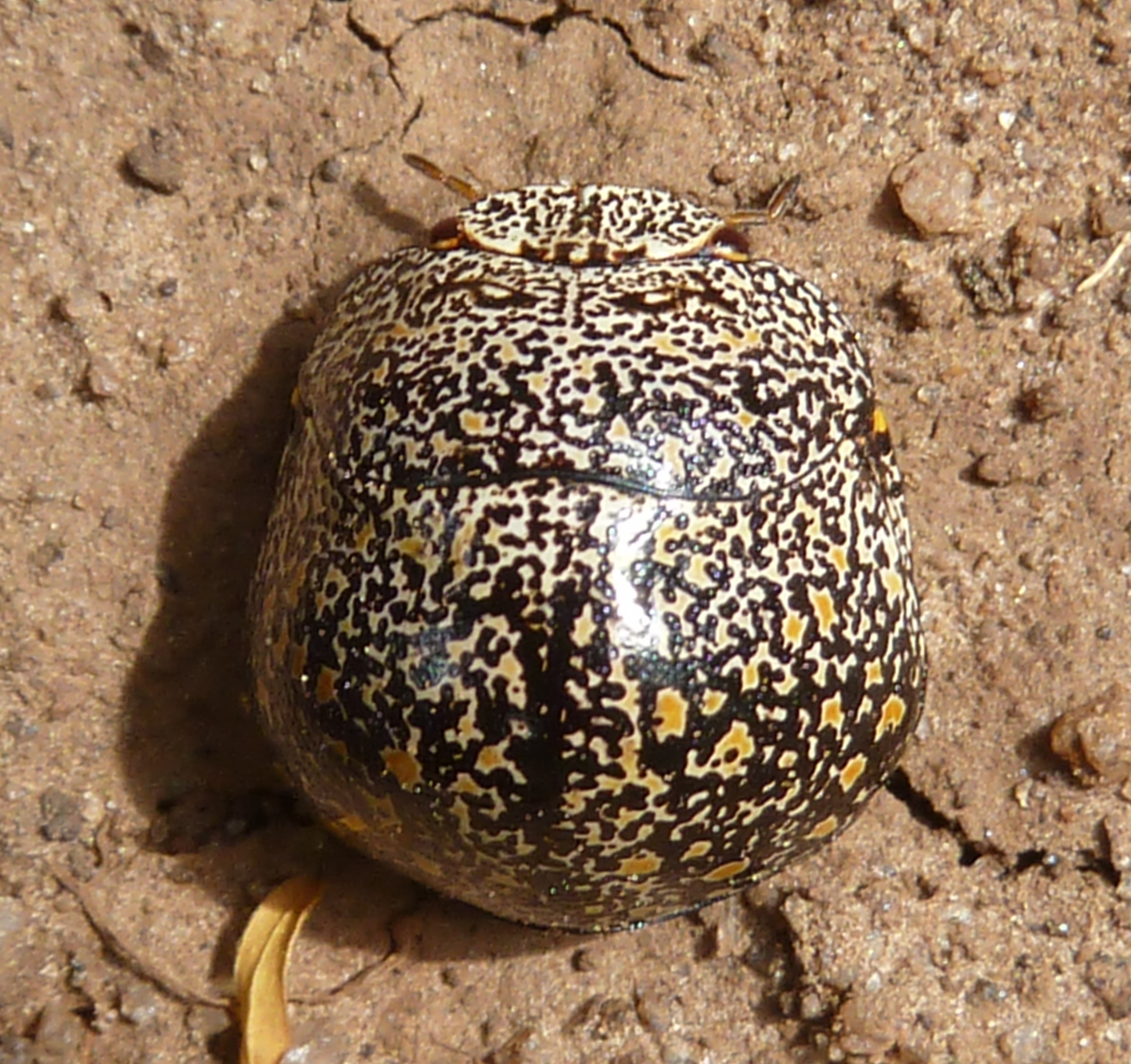
Libyaspis sp. in Africa

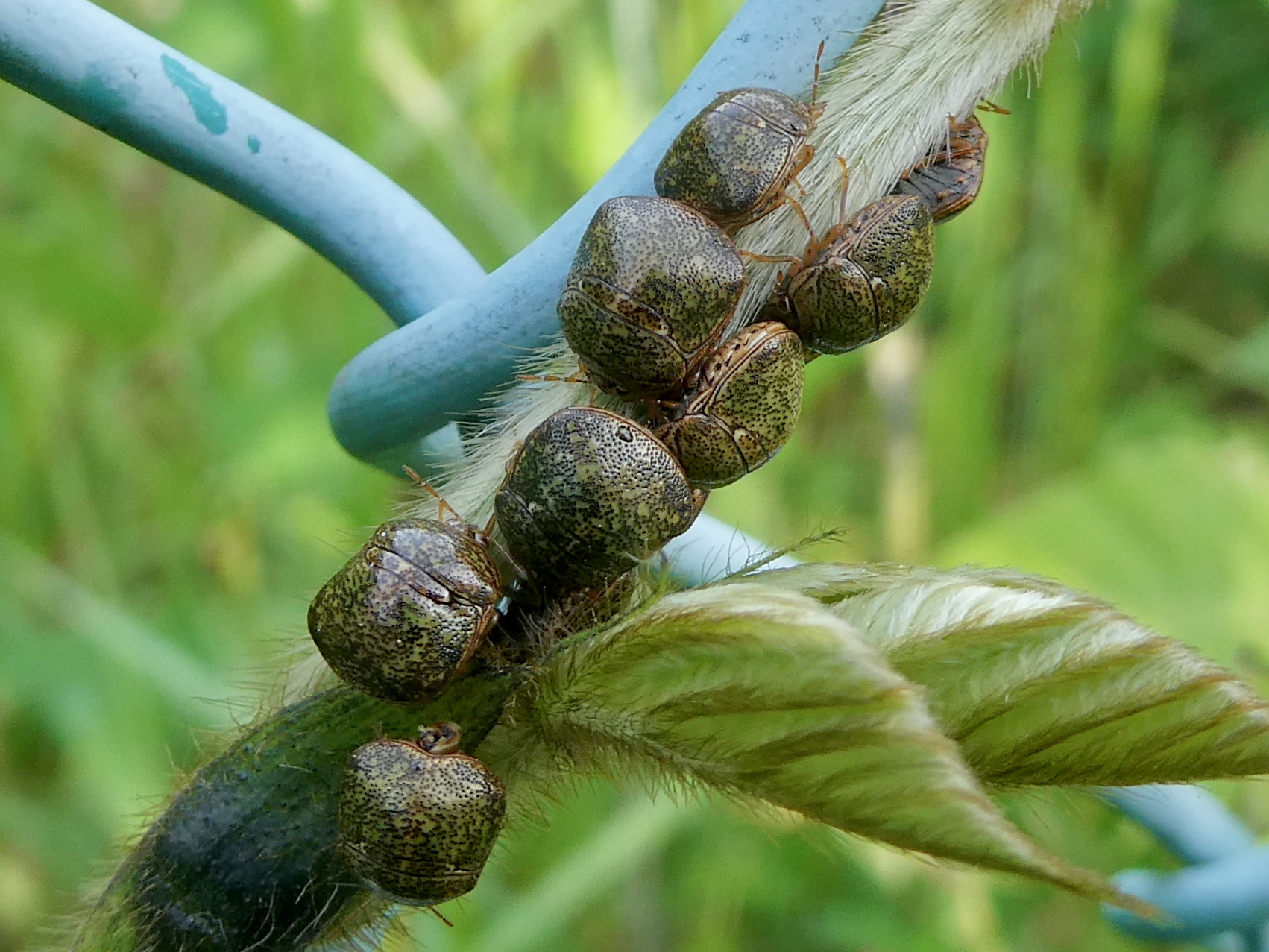
Megacopta punctatissimum in Japan

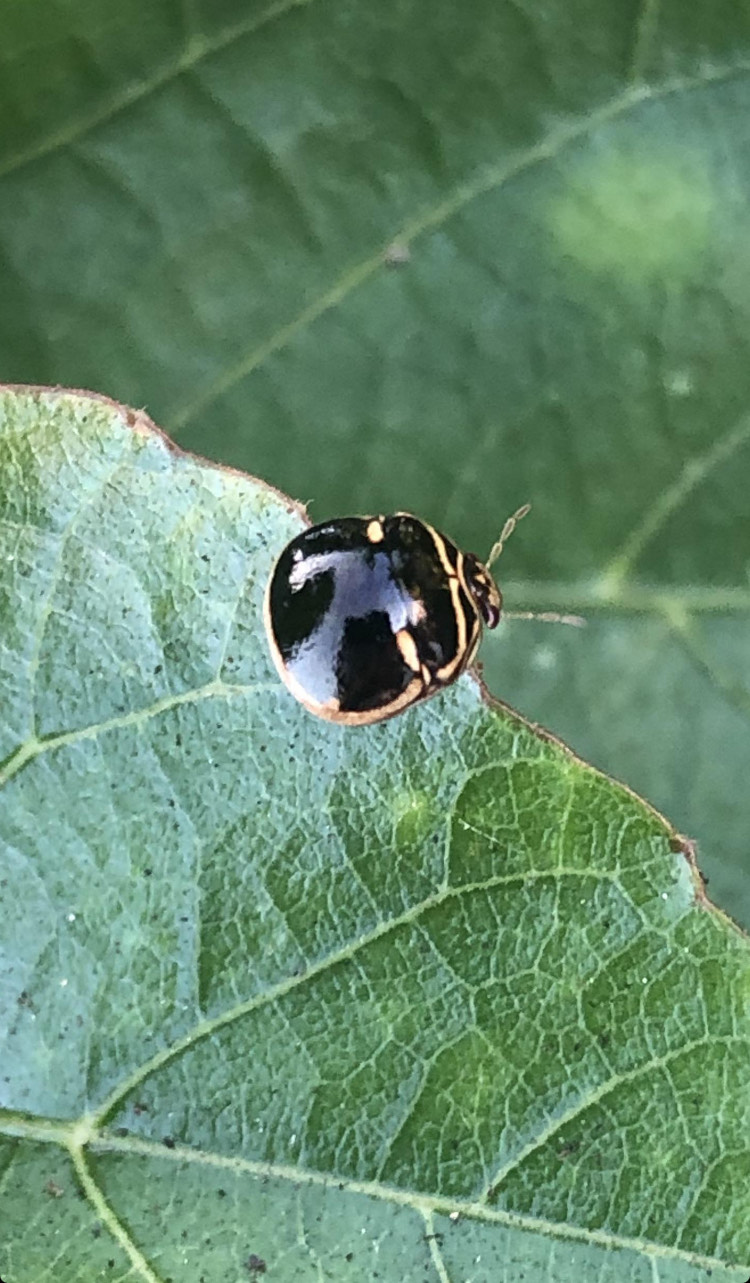
Coptosoma xanthogramma in Hawaii

== Distribution ==
This family is of Old World origin only, found primarily in tropical and subtropical areas. Some species of Coptosoma are found in temperate areas. A few species have, however, been introduced to the American continent and some Pacific islands (such as Hawaii).

Only one genus occurs in Europe, Coptosoma, with only one widely distributed species, Coptosoma scutellatum and three Mediterranean species: C. sandahli in Sicily, C. costale in Cyprus, and C. mucronatum in the Balkans.

=== Species introduced to other areas ===
Coptosoma xanthogramma was introduced to Hawaii in 1965.

Two species were introduced to the New World: Megacopta cribraria, introduced in 2009 to Georgia (United States), and Brachyplatys aeneus, introduced to Central America and Florida. M. cribraria quickly spread to other states in the American South, where it has become a pest of soybeans.

Coptosoma scutellatum on Onobrychis
