= Remastering =

Remaster refers to quality enhancement of sound or picture of a previously existing recording.

Remastering may also refer to:

- Software remastering, the process of customizing a software or operating system distribution for personal or "off-label" usage
- Mastering (audio), a form of audio post-production

== See also ==
- List of remastering software
