= Reconstructor =

Software to customize Ubuntu ISO images

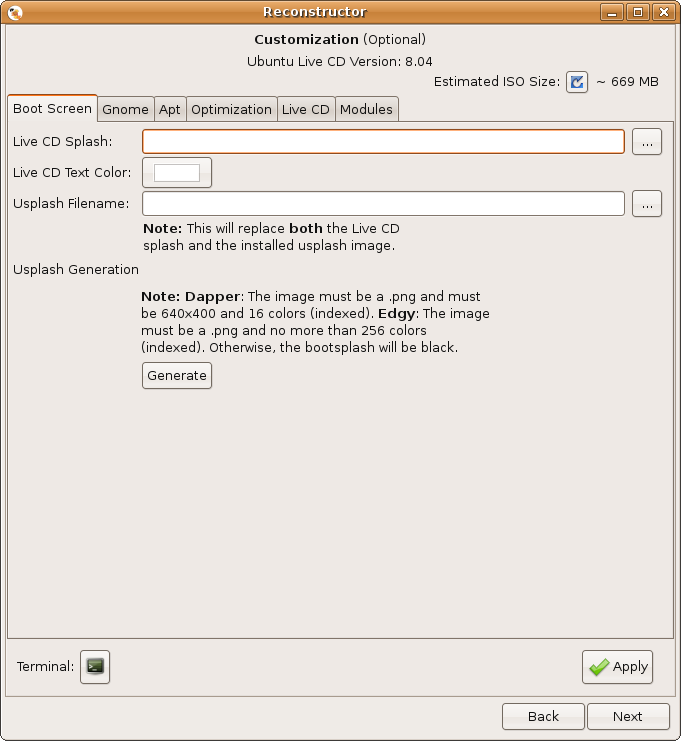
- Reconstructor 2.8 beta
- Stable release: 3.5 / March 16, 2011
- Written in: Python
- Operating system: Ubuntu
- License: "reconstructor engine" is open-source, web-based interface is closed-source
- Website: github.com/ehazlett/reconstructor.engine
- Repository: github.com/ehazlett/reconstructor.engine

Reconstructor is a program that allows anyone to customize an ISO image of Ubuntu or its variants (Kubuntu, Xubuntu). The website is no longer functioning.

== Features ==
- Ability to add software to the new compilation
- Ability to enable all the repositories and add custom ones

== See also ==
- Software remastering
- List of remastering software
