= Mklivecd =

mklivecd is a script for Linux distributions that allows for one to compile a "snapshot" of the current hard drive partition and all data which resides in it (all settings, applications, documents, bookmarks, etc.) and compress it into an ISO 9660 CD-image. This allows easy backup of a user's data and also makes it easy to create customized Linux-distribution. Some Linux-distributions like PCLinuxOS include a graphical frontend for easier script usage.

== Used by ==
- AmaroK Live CD
- Dreamlinux
- Mandriva Linux
- Ruby on Rails Live CD
- Unity Linux Live CD

== See also ==
- Live CD
- Software remastering
- Remastersys, a similar tool (for Debian/Ubuntu)
- List of remastering software
