= Remastersys =

Open source Linux application

remastersys
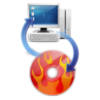

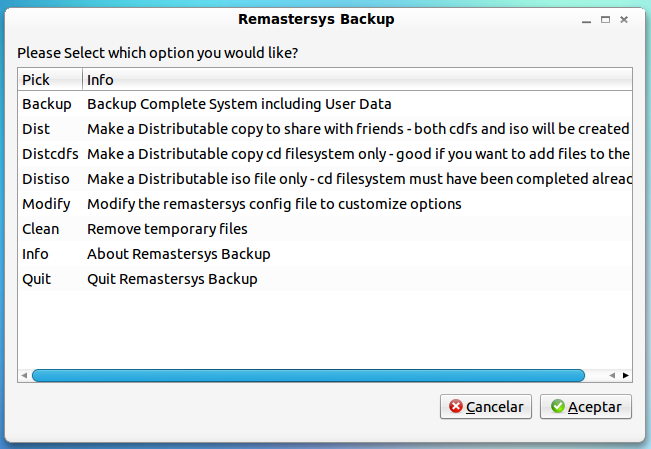
- Developer: Tony BrijeskiBreyta
- Stable release: Discontinued / July 17, 2015
- Repository: gitlab.com/remastersys/LinuxRespin
- Written in: Bash
- Operating system: Debian, Ubuntu
- Available in: English
- License: GNU GPL Version 2

remastersys is a free and open-source program for Debian, Ubuntu-based, Linux Mint or derivative software systems that can:

- Create a customized Live CD/Live USB (a remaster) of Debian and its derivatives.
- Back up an entire system, including user data, to an installable Live CD/DVD.

As of April 28, 2013, the originator's direct development has ceased.
After this project development ceased by the originator - Fragadelic, a group of developers who are members of Copper Linux User Group in Arizona, began Respin. This development (project "fork") was in transition to new supporters. The original code was received by the originator and the team members discussed the fork with him. This fork released a working version late July 2015. In early October 2015, the Debian Principal Developer, reverted to maintaining Remastersys, but kept Linux Respin open as a project for future features and development. Both the Ubuntu developer/maintainer, Sergio Mejia, and the Debian developer/maintainer, Marcia "aicra" Wilbur, keep respin available on gitlab and launchpad respectively.

== History ==
It was initially created to be able to easily back up or create a distributable copy of an Ubuntu or derivative installation. Inspiration for this tool came from the mklivecd script that Mandriva uses and the remasterme script that is in PCLinuxOS. Since those scripts were not very easy to port to Ubuntu, it was written from scratch.

== Uses ==
remastersys is intended to serve as an easy way to create a customized Live CD/DVD version of Ubuntu. The resulting iso can also be installed on a USB pendrive, creating a Live USB distro, using either a command-line approach or a graphical tool such as UNetbootin. Future enhancements discussion include possible rescue software incorporated with remastersys.

It has a command line version and a GUI version.

== See also ==
- List of remastering software
