= Knoppix =

Linux operating system

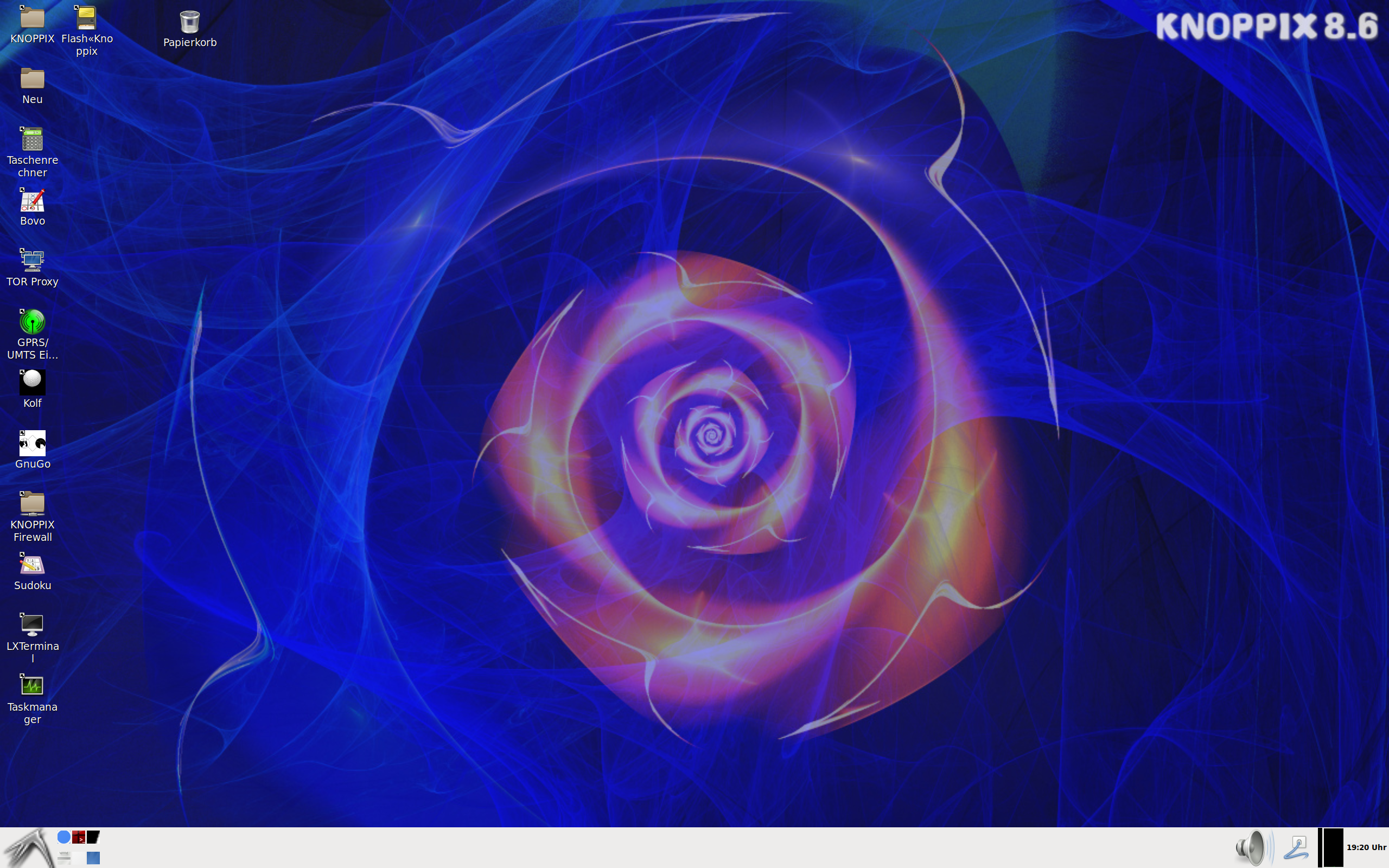
- KNOPPIX 8.6
- Developer: Klaus Knopper
- OS family: Linux (Unix-like)
- Working state: Current
- Source model: Open source
- Initial release: 30 September 2000; 25 years ago
- Latest release: 9.3 / 5 May 2022; 4 years ago
- Available in: German and English
- Update method: LTS
- Package manager: APT (frontend); dpkg (maintenance)
- Kernel type: Monolithic (Linux)
- Userland: GNU
- Default user interface: LXDE
- License: Free software licenses (mainly GPL)
- Official website: www.knopper.net/knoppix/index-en.html

Knoppix, stylized KNOPPIX (/ˈknɒpɪks/ KNOP-iks), is an operating system based on Debian designed to be run directly from a CD or DVD (Live CD) or a USB flash drive (Live USB). It was first released in 2000 by German Linux consultant Klaus Knopper, and was one of the first popular live distributions. Knoppix is loaded from the removable medium and decompressed into a RAM drive. The decompression is transparent and on-the-fly.

There are two main editions, available in both English and German: the traditional compact-disc (700 megabytes) edition and the DVD (4.7 gigabytes) "Maxi" edition.

Knoppix mostly consists of free and open source software, but also includes some proprietary software, as long as it fulfills certain conditions. Knoppix can be used to copy files easily from hard drives with inaccessible operating systems. To quickly and more safely use Linux software, the Live CD can be used instead of installing another OS.

== Contents ==
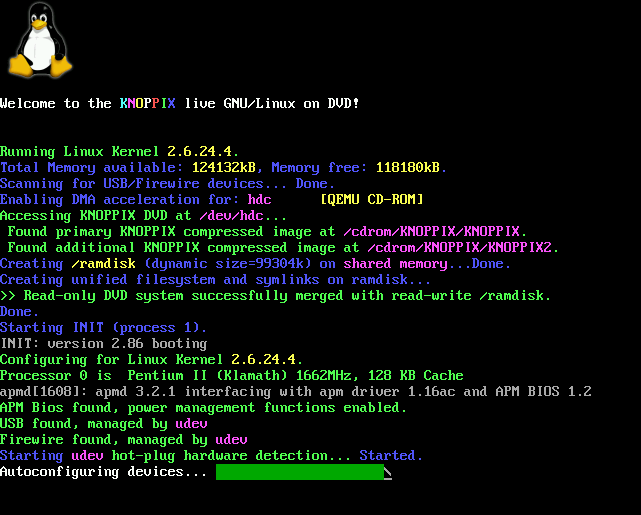
The classic Knoppix start-up process

More than 1000 software packages are included on the CD edition, and more than 2600 packages are included on the DVD edition. Up to nine gigabytes can be stored on the DVD in compressed form. These packages include:

- LXDE, a lightweight X11 desktop environment; default since Knoppix 6.0 and later
- MPlayer, with MP3 audio, and Ogg Vorbis audio playback support
- Internet access software, including the KPPP dialer and ISDN utilities
- The Mozilla Firefox web browser
- The Mozilla Thunderbird e-mail client
- GIMP, an image manipulation program
- Tools for data rescue and system repair
- Network analysis and administration tools
- LibreOffice, a comprehensive office suite
- Terminal server

== Hardware requirements ==
Minimum hardware requirements for Knoppix:

- Intel/AMD-compatible processor (i486 or later)
- Minimum RAM memory requirements:
  - 32 MB for text mode;
  - Live environment with no swap:
    - 512 MB for graphics mode with just LXDE
    - 1 GB to use the web browser and productivity software
    - 2 GB recommended
- Bootable optical drive:
  - DVD-ROM for current versions;
  - CD-ROM for version 7.2 and older, or a boot floppy and standard CD-ROM (IDE/ATAPI or SCSI)
- Standard SVGA-compatible graphics card
- Serial or PS/2 standard mouse, or an IMPS/2-compatible USB-mouse

== Saving changes in the environment ==
Prior to Knoppix 3.8.2, any documents or settings a user created would disappear upon reboot. This lack of persistence then made it necessary to save documents directly to a hard drive partition, over the network, or to some removable media, such as a USB flash drive.

It was also possible to set up a "persistent home directory", where any documents or settings written to the user's home directory would automatically be redirected to a hard drive or removable media, which could be automatically mounted on bootup. A single file, knoppix.img, was cached on the rewritable media and used to simulate a file system into which files were written for later use. This allowed the user to transparently write to their home directory.

Union mount support was added in version 3.8.1 through UnionFS. This was later replaced by Aufs in 5.1.0 to improve stability. The union mount allowed virtual updates to the data on the read-only CD/DVD media by storing changes on separate writable media and then representing the combination of the two as single storage device. The writable media could be memory (ramdisk), a hard disk, USB flash drive, etc. This means that the user could modify the software installed on the Knoppix system, such as by using APT to install or update software. The storage device containing the changes needed to be present whenever Knoppix is started, else only the original data from the disc would be used. While Knoppix would scan available storage devices for a persistent home directory by default, a user could dictate a specific location with a boot option (see below) such as:

home=/dev/hda1/knoppix.img

By carrying a Knoppix CD and a USB flash drive, a user could have the same environment, programs, settings, and data available on any computer that could run Knoppix.

This functionality was only available through Knoppix 5.1.1 (CD release) or 5.3.1 (DVD release). Subsequently, the Live CD paradigm has transformed into portable operating systems that run on external storage.

== Boot options ==
When using Knoppix as a Live CD, one can use boot options, also known as "cheatcodes", to override a default setting or automatic hardware detection when it fails. For example, the user may wish to boot into a plain console, or proceed without SCSI support. For this, Knoppix allows the user to enter one or more cheat codes at the prompt before booting. If the user does not enter a cheat code, or does not press any key before the timeout, Knoppix will boot with its default options. For example, to set the language to French rather than the default, one would type:

knoppix lang=fr

Knoppix is a 32-bit Debian Linux based distro, but recent releases (including the latest version 7.6) have also been equipped with a 64-bit kernel on the DVD edition, where it will automatically boot up for 64-bit computers, or by using the boot option knoppix64 manually in the command-line prompt, while knoppix will boot up the 32-bit kernel. Neither PAE nor 64-bit applications are supported by Knoppix, and more than 4GB of system memory can only be used with a 64-bit kernel.

The DVD edition of Knoppix can also be loaded onto a USB flash drive, with flash-knoppix under the Knoppix system, such that "the KNOPPIX Live System starts and runs about factor 5 faster from USB flash disk than from CD or DVD!". Besides that, the experimental UEFI support is provided for USB flash drive rather than DVD media. 32-bit UEFI firmware can only boot up the 32-bit kernel, while 64-bit UEFI firmware can only boot up the 64-bit kernel. The text interface for UEFI is similar with it for BIOS, one can also press key F2 and F3 to access information on boot options.

== Versions ==
Knoppix version history
Version	Release date	CD	DVD
1.4	2000-09-30	Yes	No
1.6	2001-04-26	Yes	No
2.1	2002-03-14	Yes	No
2.2	2002-05-14	Yes	No
3.1	2002-10-01	Yes	No
3.2	2003-06-16	Yes	No
3.3	2003-09-22	Yes	No
3.4	2004-05-17	Yes	No
3.5 LinuxTag version	2004-06	No	Yes
3.6	2004-08-16	Yes	No
3.7	2004-12-09	Yes	No
3.8 CeBIT version	2005-02-28	Yes	No
3.8.1	2005-04-08	Yes	No
3.8.2	2005-05-12	Yes	No
3.9	2005-06-01	Yes	No
4.0 LinuxTag version	2005-06-22	No	Yes
4.0 updated	2005-08-16	No	Yes
4.0.2	2005-09-23	Yes	Yes
5.0 CeBIT version	2006-02-25	No	Yes
5.0.1	2006-06-02	Yes	Yes
5.1.0	2006-12-30	Yes	Yes
5.1.1	2007-01-04	Yes	Yes
5.2 CeBIT version	2007-03	No	Yes
5.3 CeBIT version	2008-02-12	No	Yes
5.3.1	2008-03-26	No	Yes
ADRIANE
6.0.0	2009-01-28	Yes	No
6.0.1	2009-02-08	Yes	No
6.1 CeBIT version	2009-02-25	Yes	Yes
6.2 / ADRIANE 1.2	2009-11-18	Yes	Yes
6.2.1	2010-01-31	Yes	Yes
6.3 CeBIT version	2010-03-02	No	Yes
6.4.3	2010-12-20	Yes	Yes
6.4.4	2011-02-01	Yes	Yes
6.5 CeBIT version	2011-03	No	Yes
6.7.0	2011-08-03	Yes	Yes
6.7.1	2011-09-16	Yes	Yes
7.0.1	2012-05-24	No	Yes
7.0.2	2012-05-30	No	Yes
7.0.3	2012-07-01	Yes	Yes
7.0.4	2012-08-20	Yes	Yes
7.0.5	2012-12-21	Yes	Yes
7.2.0	2013-06-24	Yes	Yes
7.4.0	2014-08-07	No	Yes
7.4.1	2014-09-15	No	Yes
7.4.2	2014-09-28	No	Yes
7.5 CeBIT version	2015-03-16	No	Yes
7.6.0	2015-11-21	No	Yes
7.6.1	2016-01-16	No	Yes
7.7.0 CeBIT version	2016-03-14	No	Yes
7.7.1	2016-10-27	No	Yes
8.0.0 CeBIT version	2017-03-24	No	Yes
8.1.0	2017-09-27	No	Yes
8.2.0	2018-05-16	No	Yes
8.3.0 (DELUG-DVD)	2018-06-07	No	Yes
8.5.0 Linux-Magazin / Linux-User edition	2019-03-14	No	Yes
8.6.0	2019-08-08	No	Yes
8.6.1	2019-11-22	No	Yes
9.0 (DELUG-DVD)	2020-03-05	No	Yes
9.1	2021-01-25	Yes	Yes
9.2 (DELUG-DVD)	2021-04	No	Yes
9.3 (DELUG-DVD)	2022-06	No	Yes

The table (to the right) shows the version history of major releases.

=== Knoppix 4.x–5.x ===
As of April 2008, from version 4 up until 5.1.1, Knoppix has been split into a DVD "maxi" edition (with over 9 GB of software), and a CD "light" edition; both were developed in parallel.

Up until Knoppix 5.1.1, the CD editions contained a selection of graphical environments, including the TWM window manager, and KDE 3 — a feature-complete desktop environment default in Knoppix 5.3.1 and earlier.

No further development is being done on the traditional 5.x versions.

=== Knoppix 6.x ===
KNOPPIX 6.0.1 / ADRIANE 1.1 is a CD-edition again, and a complete rebuild from scratch. LXDE was made the default desktop environment, and the edition contains a substantially reduced software collection in order to easily fit on a CD.

The KNOPPIX 6.2.1 release has both CD and DVD editions, and ADRIANE 1.2 only has a CD-edition.

Knoppix 6.7.1 has the last CD version with stable touchpad drivers.

=== Knoppix 7.x ===
From June 2013 on until March 2019, Knoppix 7.2 was the most recent release with a CD edition. By 2018, its software had become very outdated, as the libc6 2.17 library no longer suffices for installation of several modern packages. The 7.x version range is known for instabilities with touchpads.

Version 7.2 still remains the most recent CD version of Knoppix in wide distribution.

=== Knoppix 8.x ===
The KNOPPIX 8.0.0 edition was released at CeBIT 2017.

KNOPPIX 8.1.0 was released in September 2017 as the first public release in the 8.x series. The version 8.0.0 has the dual boot, and a choice between three different desktops:LXDE as default option, KDE or GNOME.

Knoppix 8.5 was a DVD version that was not available for download, but was published as an exclusive version only bundled with a physical edition of Linux-Magazin or LinuxUser. Version 8.5 no longer includes Systemd, which was replaced by elogind. Spectre and Meltdown kernel vulnerabilities have been mitigated.

Knoppix 8.6.1 (and newer) is a DVD version available for download on Knoppix mirrors.

=== Knoppix 9.x ===
Knoppix 9.0 (DELUG edition) was released in April 2020 to the readers of the German edition of Linux Magazin and was not available for download. But following versions (9.1 and further) are available on the Knoppix website

== Derivatives ==
=== Adriane Knoppix ===
Adriane Knoppix is a variation that is intended for blind and visually impaired people, which can be used entirely without vision oriented output devices. It was released in the third quarter of 2007 as a Live CD. Adriane Knoppix is named after Adriane Knopper, the wife of Klaus Knopper, the developer of Knoppix. Adriane has a visual impairment, and assisted Klaus with the development of the software. The name Adriane is also a backronym for "Audio Desktop Reference Implementation And Networking Environment".

Adriane Knoppix is intended not only for the blind but also for beginners who do not know much about computers. It uses the SUSE Blinux screen reader with a phoneme generator and speech engine for normal output.

=== Other variations ===
Knoppix family tree

- Kali Linux, a live CD/USB distribution now based on Debian. It is a rewrite of BackTrack, which was based on Knoppix. Like its predecessors, Kali is designed for digital forensics and penetration testing. BackTrack itself merged the Auditor Security Collection and WHAX distros.
- Kanotix, a live distribution now based on Debian
- KnoppMyth, a distro that attempts to make the Linux and MythTV installation as trivial as possible
- Musix GNU+Linux, specifically for musicians
- Poseidon Linux, a distribution specifically geared for the scientific community
- KnoppiXMAME, designed for playing MAME videogames
- PelicanHPC for clustering
- TechUSB, an automated computer distro produced by RepairTech, Inc.

==== Unmaintained projects ====
Sorted chronologically, in ascending order.

Name	Goal and notes	Last version	— dates back to
ClusterKnoppix	Uses openMosix.	3.6	1 September 2004; 21 years ago
Feather Linux	128MB image with Linux 2.4, works as a Live CD and Live USB.	0.7.5	4 July 2005; 20 years ago
Auditor Security Collection	Intended to test the security of networks. Merged into BackTrack by early 2007.	200605-02	20 June 2005; 20 years ago
Quantian	Numerical and quantitative analysis. The most recent release is based on Knoppix 4.0.2.	7.9.2	1 March 2006; 20 years ago
Kaella	The French translation of Knoppix	3.2	19 September 2007; 18 years ago
Kurumin	In Brazilian Portuguese. Poseidon Linux is a later distribution that was based on Kurumin.	8.6	18 June 2008; 17 years ago
VMKnoppix	VM tools	5.3.1 Xen3.2.1	27 August 2008; 17 years ago
Dreamlinux	A Brazilian distribution branched off from Morphix, centers on ease of use and graphics performance.	5.0	1 January 2012; 14 years ago
BackTrack	Parts based on a merge from Auditor Security Collection.	5 R3	15 August 2012; 13 years ago

== See also ==
- Comparison of Linux distributions
- Debian Live

== Notes ==
=== Books ===
- Granneman, Scott (2005). Hacking Knoppix. Wiley. ISBN 978-0-7645-9784-8.
- Hentzen, Whil (2007). Knoppix Explained. Hentzenwerke. ISBN 978-1-930919-56-3.
- Rankin, Kyle (2004). Knoppix Hacks. O'Reilly. ISBN 978-0-596-00787-4.

=== News article ===
- Distrowatch.com interview with Klaus Knopper (2002)
