= Klaus Knopper =

German computer scientist (born 1968)

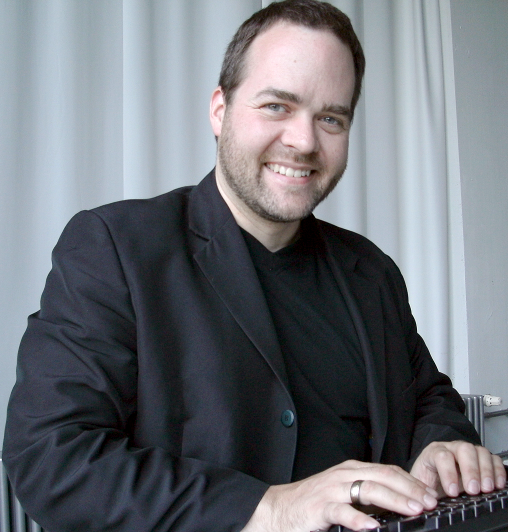
- Klaus Knopper (2009)
- Born: 1968 (age 57–58); Ingelheim, West Germany
- Education: Kaiserslautern University of Technology
- Known for: creator of Knoppix co-founder of the LinuxTag expo
- Spouse: Adriane Knopper
- Website: http://www.knopper.net/

Klaus Knopper (born 1968 in Ingelheim) is a German electrical engineer and free software developer.

Knopper is the creator of Knoppix, a well-known live CD Linux distribution. He received his degree in electrical engineering from the Kaiserslautern University of Technology (in German: Technische Universität Kaiserslautern), co-founded LinuxTag in 1996 (a major European Linux expo) and has been a self-employed information technology consultant since 1998. He also teaches at the Kaiserslautern University of Applied Sciences.

Knopper is married to Adriane Knopper, who has a visual impairment. She assisted Knopper with a version of Knoppix for blind and visually impaired people, released in the third quarter of 2007 as a live CD. Her name was given to Adriane Knoppix.

Adriane is a desktop or "non-graphical user interface" for blind computer beginners. It will work on any Linux distribution that has a screenreader (preferably SBL (Screenreader for Blind Linux Users)) and some text-based tools for Internet access and normal work.
