= Poseidon Linux =

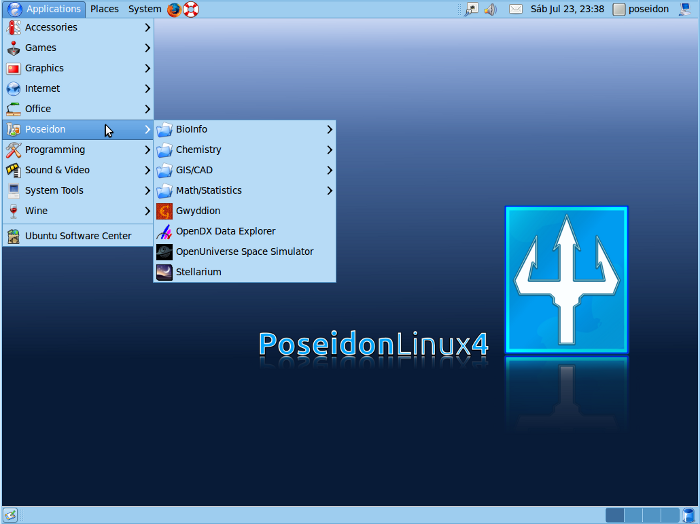
- Poseidon Linux 4 showing menu
- Developer: Poseidon Linux team
- OS family: Linux (Unix-like)
- Working state: Discontinued
- Source model: Open source
- Latest release: 9.0 / Sept 2017
- Kernel type: Monolithic kernel
- Default user interface: GNOME
- License: Various
- Official website: sites.google.com/site/poseidonlinux/Home

Poseidon Linux was a Linux operating system based on Ubuntu (originally based on Kurumin) maintained by developers located at the Rio Grande Federal University in Rio Grande do Sul, Brazil, and the MARUM institute in Germany.

Poseidon Linux was aimed at the international scientific community, it came with a range of applications for fields such as GIS, 3D visualization, and statistics.

== Naming ==
The name Poseidon was chosen after the Greek God because many of the projects developers worked in Oceanology.

== History ==
The development team stated that after Poseidon 5.0, the distribution would focus on bathymetry, seafloor mapping, and GIS software. Many of the bundled CAD and scientific programs were removed, but may be separately available for download from compatible repositories.

Around 2016 the 3 main Poseidon Linux domains (poseidon.furg.br, es.poseidonlinux.org, en.poseidonlinux.org) seemingly expired and their google site domain rebranded from "the Official Website of Poseidon Linux in English" to "The Official Website of Poseidon Linux"

The project is seemingly dead with the last release having been in 2017.

== Releases ==
Timeline
| Version | Date | Comment |
|---|---|---|
| 2.0 | 2005? | The release date may be 2005-10-25. |
| 3.0 | 2008-06-21 | The projects base distribution was changed from Kurumin to Ubuntu LTS. For the first time a 64-bit version was released. |
| 4.0 | 2010-10-27 | Based on Ubuntu 10.04 LTS. |
| 5.0 | 2013/2014? | Based on Ubuntu 12.04.1 LTS. |
| 6.0 | | Based on Ubuntu 12.04.1 LTS. |
| 7.0 | 2015-07-03 | Based on Ubuntu 14.04 LTS. |
| 8.0 | 2016-11-23 | Based on Ubuntu 16.04.1 LTS. |
| 9.0 | 2017-09-29 | Based on Ubuntu 16.04.3 LTS. |
