= Dreamlinux =

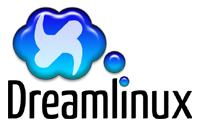

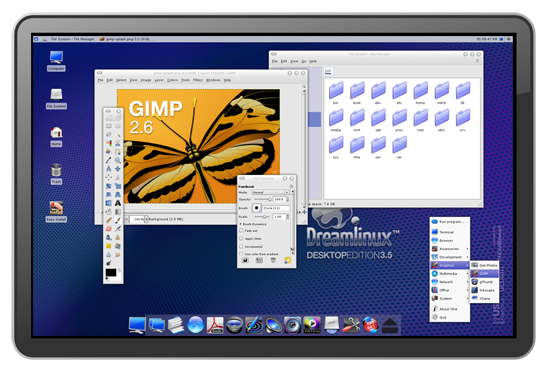
- Dreamlinux 5.0
- OS family: Linux (Unix-like)
- Working state: Discontinued
- Latest release: 5.0 / January 1, 2012
- Available in: English and Portuguese
- Supported platforms: IA-32
- Kernel type: Monolithic
- License: Mainly the GNU GPL / various others
- Official website: www.dreamlinux.info

Dreamlinux was a Brazilian computer operating system based on Debian Linux. It can boot as a live CD, from USB flash drive, or can be installed on a hard drive. The distribution's GUI aims to have a centered animated toolbar. As of October 2012, the Dreamlinux Project has been discontinued.

== Editions ==
=== Dreamlinux 2.2 MM GL Edition (2007) ===
DreamLinux Multimedia Edition 2.2 with AIGLX provides Beryl-AIGLX by default, which can be utilized after the initial installation. One of its key features is its ability to configure AIGLX for NVIDIA and ATI cards automatically. The distribution received a favorable review for its appearance and functionality.

=== Dreamlinux 3.0 (2008) ===
Dreamlinux Desktop Edition 3.0 features a complete redesign. It supports a totally independent architecture named Flexiboost, based on overlaid modules. The feature allows the co-existence of two (or more) separate window managers (currently GNOME and Xfce), sharing the same customized appearance. Both working environments share all the applications available.

In addition to the 700MB iso file (CD image), a 130MB Multimedia Module is also available, including DVD support. This is primarily intended for use when running from USB flash drive, rather than from live-CD mode.

==== New applications ====
The following applications were not included in previous releases:

- Gthumb (replacing GQview)
- Pidgin instant messenger;
- Ndiswrapper module
- WineHQ + Wine Doors installer

==== Other improvements ====
- Now booting from any CDROM or DVD-R/W unit
- Improved Dreamlinux Control Panel
- Improved Dreamlinux Installer
- Improved Easy Install application
- Theme-Switcher on Gnome changes theme without the need to restart X
- Setup-Network Manager for stop, start, restart, stop network on booting, start network on booting. Network is now set up to automatically start during boot.
- Cupsys also starts on boot
- New wizard for emerald-themes
- New wallpapers
- New icons
- New Avant Window Manager themes and AWN-Dock (check AWN Manager on DCP)
- CompizFusion enabler in DCP switches default Engage dock to AWN Dock.
- New GDM themes, now featuring countdowns

== Dreamlinux 3.5 (2009) ==
Dreamlinux 3.5 is an update to the original Dreamlinux 3.0 desktop. This release features the XFCE desktop with the Gnome Desktop as an additional option in the form of a module. This release uses the Debian Lenny desktop. It features the Linux kernel version 2.6.28.5 as well as new icons and a new GTK+ theme.

There is also the option to install directly to a USB Memory Stick in two modes.

Live Dream

This runs the same as a Live CD, and does not save changes.

Persistent Dream

This runs as though Dream is installed onto the hard drive, and saves any changes to configuration that are made. It is only recommended for use on USB drives that are 2 GB.

== DreamLinux 5.0 (2012) ==
DreamLinux 5.0 is based on Debian Wheezy 7.0 with Linux kernel 3.1. The only edition available is an ISO image around 956 MB. It features:

- Xfce 4.8 desktop with quite similar look to MAC OS X user interface.
- Programming environments for Ruby Lua, Vala, C, C++, Python and Perl
- Server and network applications: Apache2, PHP5, MySQL, Samba, Netatalk, TorrentFlux, SSH, Bluetooth, Network-Manager, Avahi-Daemon (Bonjour), Preload, Fancontrol, Cpufreqd.
- Pre-installed applications for end-users:
1. Chromium web browser.
2. Audio, video codec for playing many multimedia formats,
3. SoftMaker office suite Textmaker, Planmaker and Presentations.
4. Graphics editors “Gimp and InkScape“, along with shotwell photo manager and FoxitReader PDF reader application.

Dreamlinux 5.0 offers new installer called FlexiBoot which allows users to easily install Dreamlinux 5.0 in USB external hard drive and use it anywhere, or install it to the internal hard drive. MKDistro is a simple utility that allows users to build their own customized Dreamlinux and Debian-based distribution.

== Live USB ==
A Live USB version of Dreamlinux can be created manually or with UNetbootin.
