= LinuxTag =

Defunct German annual open-source conference

Logo

LinuxTag was an annual Free and Open Source Software (FOSS) conference and exposition with an emphasis on Linux but also BSD descendants located in Germany. The name is a compound with the German Tag meaning "Day", as it was initially a single day conference, but soon extended to multiple days, then always including a weekend. LinuxTag was the world's largest FLOSS conference and exhibition for years and aimed to provide a comprehensive overview of the Linux and Free Software market as well to promote contacts between users and developers. With this broad approach LinuxTag was one of the most important events of this kind.

LinuxTag's slogan, "Where .COM meets .ORG", refers to its stated aim of bringing together commercial and non-commercial groups in the IT sector. Each year's event also had its own motto, often reflecting a specific topic which was focused in that year.

== Promotion of free software ==
LinuxTag regards itself as part of the Free Software movement and hence promoted this community by an extraordinary degree through supporting numerous Open Source Software projects. LinuxTag offered these projects to promote their software and their concepts, and thus present themselves to the public in an appropriate manner, with their own booths, forums and lectures, free of charge. The goal is to encourage projects to share concepts and content to the benefit of other groups and companies, and to provide forums for in-depth discussions of new technologies and opportunities.

== LinuxTag e.V. ==
The non-profit association "LinuxTag e.V." was founded in preparation for LinuxTag's move from Kaiserslautern to the University of Stuttgart in 2000. The association plans and organizes the LinuxTag event by volunteer work and guides its ideological development. The association LinuxTag e.V. is registered in Association Register VR 2239 of the Kaiserslautern District Court. The association manages the LinuxTag name and word mark. The purpose of the association, according to its bylaws, is "the promotion of Free Software", and is pursued primarily by organizing the LinuxTag events.

The association is represented by a three-person executive board, supplemented by several representatives with delegated authority. All members of the LinuxTag association are volunteers and receive no remuneration for their service, with the sole exception from 1 April to 31 July 2005 when the First Chairman and CFO were employed and remunerated by the association. Surpluses resulting from the LinuxTag events or sponsorship are reinvested in the association's non-profit activities.

== History ==
LinuxTag was launched in 1995 by a handful of active members of the "Linux project group (PG Linux)" of the Unix-AG, a student's workgroup at the University of Kaiserslautern. They wanted to inform the fellow students and the public about Linux and Open Source Software, which both were in their early stages at this time. However, since then the event has changed venues several times to keep pace with rapidly growing numbers of speakers, exhibitors and visitors.

=== Kaiserslautern ===
The first couple of LinuxTag events were held at the University of Kaiserslautern and organized under the auspices of its Unix-AG PG Linux.

==== LinuxTag 1996 ====
The very first LinuxTag in January 1996 was a theme night on Linux attended by 70 participants, comprising six talks and a "Linux install party". (Note: german Geschichte des LinuxTags: https://www.linuxtag.org/2008/de/linuxtag/geschichte.html)

==== LinuxTag 1997/1 and 1997/2 ====
In 1997 was the only year in which two LinuxTag events were organized; the talks of these and consecutive LinuxTag events are still online.

LinuxTag 1997/1 was attended by 150 participants, despite being disturbed by freezing rain which brought most private and public transport to a halt. Hence the LinuxTag team decided to move the LinuxTag events into the summer and to organize another LinuxTag for 1997.

LinuxTag 1997/2 had a couple of hundred visitors and brought some firsts: Two tracks with talks running in parallel, occupying two days, tutorial sessions for acquiring a deeper understanding of a topic and a small exhibition at which Open Source Software projects presented their goals and achievements.

==== LinuxTag 1998 ====
The LinuxTag 1998 conference and exhibition was attended by circa 3,000 visitors. For the first time external exhibitors were present, e.g., the KDE project.

==== LinuxTag 1999 ====
The LinuxTag 1999 was announced nation-wide for the first time and hence drew some 7,000 visitors. Due to the ".com" boom which also triggered many major players in the IT industry to embrace Open Source Software, the booths from companies filled a whole building of the university, among then Hewlett-Packard, IBM, SuSE etcetera. The booths of non-commercial projects occupied another, smaller building, while the talks used all major lecture rooms. It was also the first time an opportunity to take the LPI Exam 101 was offered. This was the last time LinuxTag was held in Kaiserslautern, because the number of attendees equalled the number of students at this time at the University of Kaiserslautern and there was no space left to grow.

In the aftermath of this event, the LinuxTag association was founded.

=== Stuttgart ===
In 2000 and 2001 LinuxTag was held in Stuttgart.

==== LinuxTag 2000 ====
LinuxTag 2000 took place at the Stuttgart Trade Fair from 29 June to 2 July (i.e., four days) and was attended by approximately 17,000 visitors. The conference included a business track for the first time, devoted to such topics as IT security, legal aspects of Free Software, potential applications of Linux and Open Source Software in commercial applications. IT decision-makers presented case studies of applications of Free Software. Among the speakers were J. D. Frazer a.k.a. Illiad, the creator of User Friendly, Rob "Cmdr Taco" Malda, initiator of Slashdot and keynote speaker was Richard M. Stallman.

==== LinuxTag 2001 ====
LinuxTag 2001 was held at Stuttgart Trade Fair from 5 to 8 July, with 14,870 visitors. The event was held under the patronage of the German Ministry of Economy. Keynote speakers were Eric S. Raymond, Rob Malda of Slashdot and John "Maddog" Hall of Linux International.

=== Karlsruhe ===
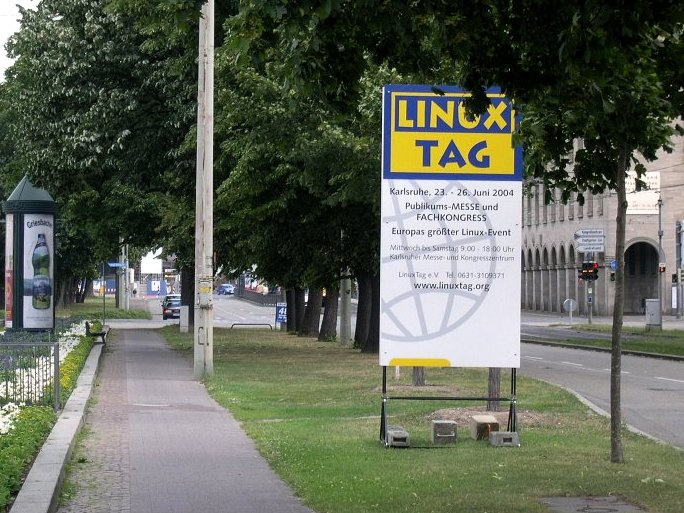
LinuxTag 2004 at Messe Karlsruhe

From 2002 to 2005, the LinuxTag conference and exhibition was held in Karlsruhe.

==== LinuxTag 2002 ====
LinuxTag 2002 happened from 6 June to 9 July 2002 for the first time at the Messe Karlsruhe with about 13,000 visitors. The motto of the conference was "Open your mind, open your heart, open your source!". Approximately 100 booths comprised the exhibition. Keynote speaker was Matthias Kalle Dalheimer.

==== LinuxTag 2003 ====
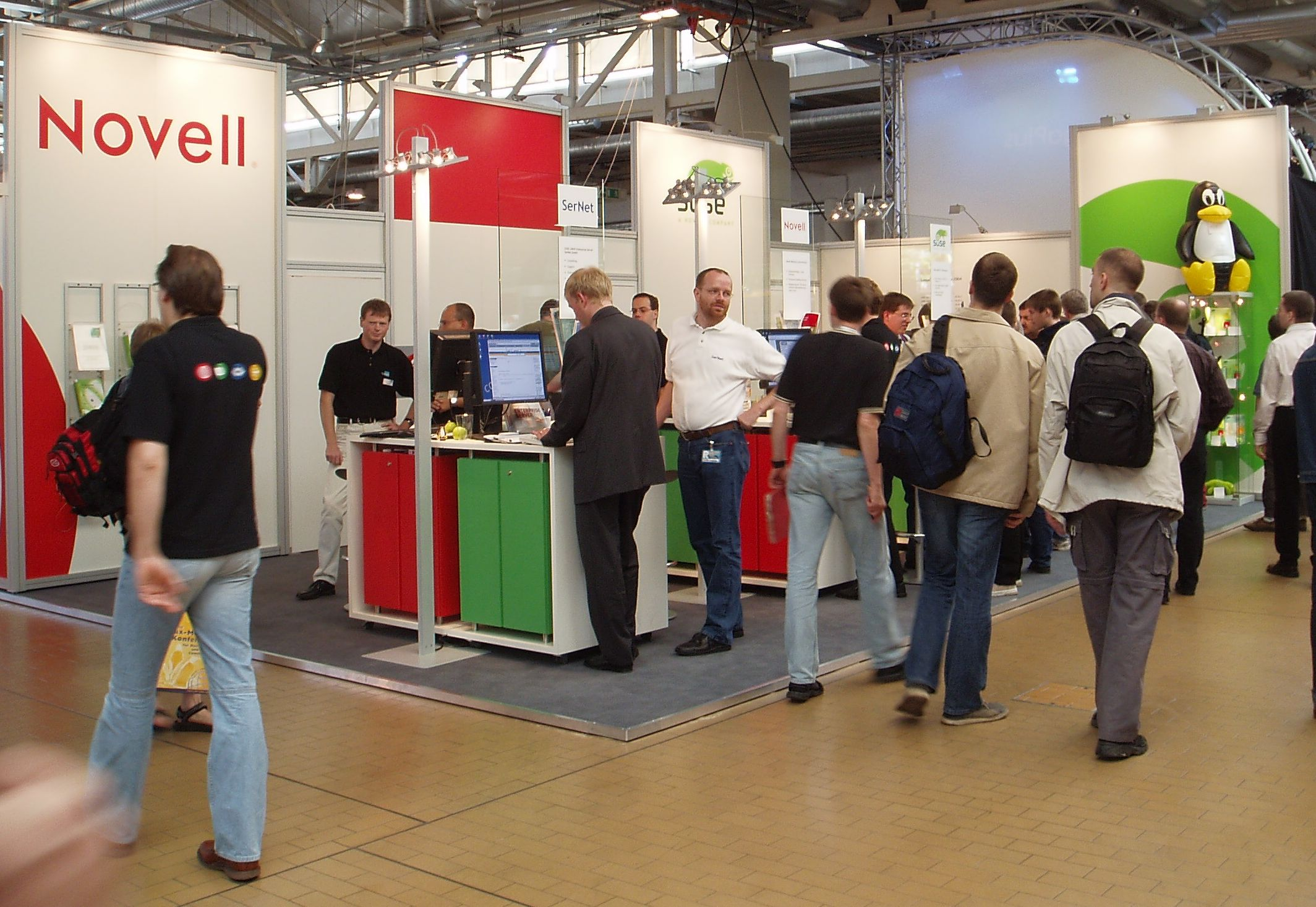
Novell/SuSE at the LinuxTag 2004

LinuxTag 2003 was titled Open Horizons and was held from 10 to 13 July 2003 at Messe Karlsruhe. Along the admission ticket for € 10, visitors received the LinuxTag edition of the initial release of the Knoppix DVD and a Tux pin. With 19,500 visitors, the number of visitors increased by 40 percent over the previous year.

Circa 150 exhibitors, both businesses and non-profit groups were represented. Apple showed Mac OS X running Open Source Software. Other highlights included the release of OpenGroupware.org, OpenOffice.org, a conversion to run Linux of several dozen Xboxes, some by a hardware modification by two solder points, some by utilizing so-called MechInstallers.

There was also a Programming Competition and on Sunday, 13 July 2003 from 13 to 14 o'clock a world record attempt took place: On a server 100 Linux desktop sessions with Gnome and KDE were simultaneously running, which could be used by everyone on the Internet.

Besides the exhibition also sub-conferences were held at which renowned experts discussed a subject. There was, for example, a Debian conference and on Sunday there was a lecture on TCPA, followed by a discussion. The Business and Government sub-conference with 400 participants grew by about 60% compared to 2002. The free lecture program was opened on Friday by the Parliamentary State Secretary, Federal Ministry of Economics and Labour, Rezzo Schlauch. Keynote speaker was Jon "Maddog" Hall.

With Webcams one could take a virtual visit of the fair. The "Pingu-Cam" recorded pictures of Penguin in the Karlsruhe Zoo, which is located right next to the location of the Messe Karlsruhe at that time.

==== LinuxTag 2004 ====
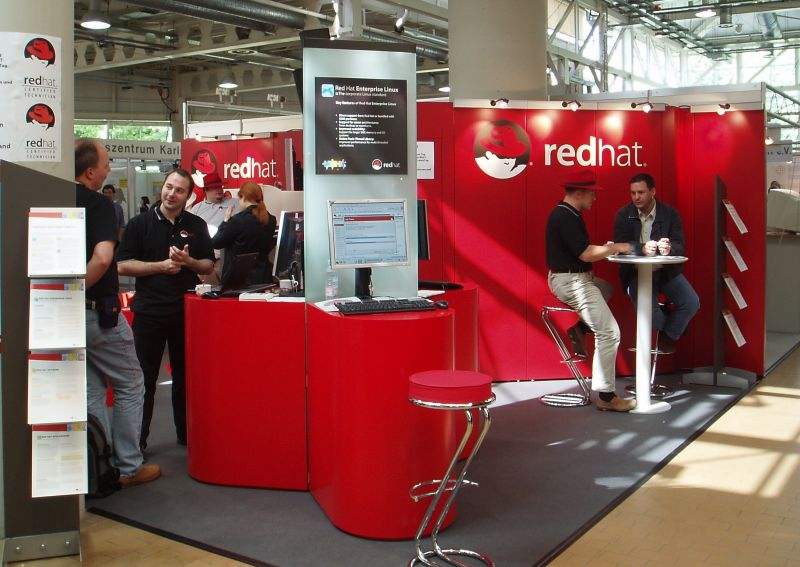
Red Hat at the LinuxTag 2004

LinuxTag 2004 took place from 23 to 26 June for the third time at the Messe Karlsruhe in 2004. Those who applied on the LinuxTag homepage got in for free. For the regular entrance fee of € 10 one received a Tux-pin, a Knoppix DVD and a DVD with FreeBSD, NetBSD and OpenBSD.

LinuxTag 2004 had the slogan "Free source - free world". 16,175 visitors were counted. A record number of about 170 exhibitors, among them many freelance projects, but also numerous large and medium-sized enterprises attended. Hewlett-Packard was the third time Official Cornerstone Partner. Other major companies at the exhibition were the C & L Verlag, Intel, Novell, Oracle, SAP and Sun Microsystems. For the first time Microsoft was represented with a booth.

On the single-day business and administration sub-conference on 24 June business and government case studies plus success stories of the use of open source software were presented. Among other things, also issues with computer viruses and worms were addressed.

For the free conference, a record of about 350 proposals from 20 countries were handed in, of which 130 could be accommodated in the program. The fundamental threat of software patents for Open Source Software was an important topic. As already in 1999 one could undergo a LPI 101 certification at LinuxTag. As at most LinuxTag events, a coding marathon and a hacking contest were performed.

==== LinuxTag 2005 ====
LinuxTag 2005 took place from 22 to 25 June at the Messe Karlsruhe. It was the 11th LinuxTag and titled "Linux everywhere". As usual a conference with far more than 100 talks and presentations was accompanied by a large exhibition with booths from more than 160 companies and projects, plus on 22 June 2005 the business and administration sub-conference. Additionally workshops and tutorials were offered.

Keynote speaker Jimmy Wales announced a collaboration between Wikipedia and KDE in his opening speech. Through a web API every program can directly access Wikipedia, which was used by the KDE Media Player Amarok version 1.3 to access the Wikipedia articles of artists.

The organizers counted about 12,000 visitors, a little less than in previous years, which was mainly caused by the newly introduced mandatory entrance fee and the hottest week of the year 2005.

=== Wiesbaden ===
In 2006 LinuxTag moved to Wiesbaden.

==== LinuxTag 2006 ====
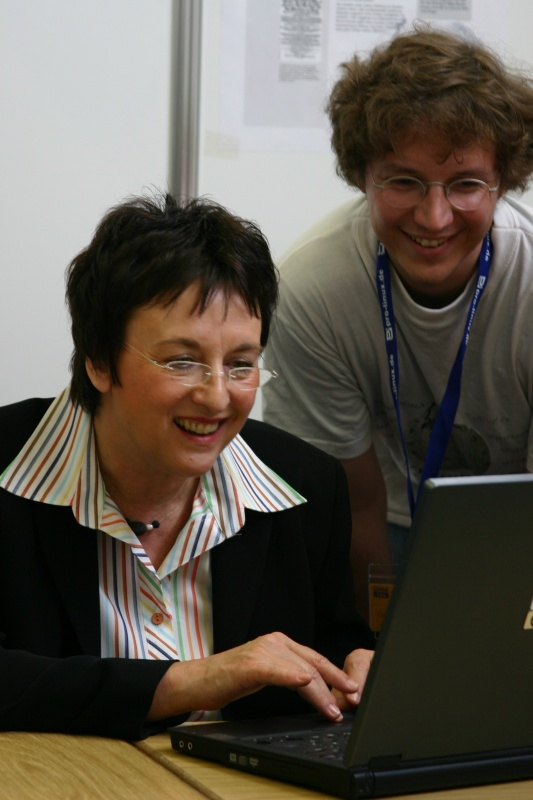
Federal Minister of Justice Brigitte Zypries at the Wikipedia booth

LinuxTag 2006 took place from 3 to 6 May 2006 in the Rhein-Main-Hallen in Wiesbaden under the motto „See, what's ahead“. Over 9,000 people from over 30 nations attended LinuxTag 2006. 150 exhibitors were present, among others IBM, Avira and Sun Microsystems, but some other regular exhibitors as Hewlett-Packard or Red Hat were missing. Three teams participated in the annual hacking contest.

The most visited talk of was the Keynote of Ubuntu founder Mark Shuttleworth. The "chief dreamer of Ubuntu" referred to himself and the good cooperation of users with developers. He stressed that Kubuntu and Ubuntu should be treated equally and that there is a good cooperation between the developers of both. The second keynote speaker was Andrew Morton There was also the opportunity to watch some of the talks by video stream, which was used by approximately 1,800 people.

=== Berlin ===
Since 2007 the LinuxTag took place in Berlin, from 2007 to 2013 at the Messe Berlin, located under the Funkturm Berlin.

==== LinuxTag 2007 ====
LinuxTag 2007 took place from 30 May to 2 June 2007 with the motto "Come in: We're open". It was attended by about 9,600 people and comprised more than 200 talks.

The event was held under the auspices of Interior Minister Wolfgang Schäuble. This sparked a lively debate due to the political attitude of Wolfgang Schäuble in his administrative role, which triggered calls to boycott LinuxTag. This was even reported and discussed outside of Germany.

==== LinuxTag 2008 ====
LinuxTag 2008 took place from 28 to 31 May at the Messe Berlin with 11,612 visitors from 31 countries and more than 200 exhibitors. The second LinuxTag in the German capital was under the patronage of (then) German Foreign Minister and Vice Chancellor Frank-Walter Steinmeier and was labelled as a part of a six-day "IT Week in the Capital Region", which also included the IT business trade fair IT Profits under the patronage of the Federal Minister of transport as a co-event to LinuxTag. LinuxTag 2008 hosted as sub-conferences the second German Asterisk day, a user and developer conference for IP Telephony and the 8th @Kit Congress, on which legal issues of professional IT use are discussed. Core topics of LinuxTag 2008 were "Highlights of digital lifestyle" and the "Mobile + Embedded Area".

==== LinuxTag 2009 ====
LinuxTag 2009 took place from 24 to 27 June at the Messe Berlin, attracting over 10,000 visitors. As in 2008 it was placed under the patronage of German Foreign Minister and Vice Chancellor Frank-Walter Steinmeier. The new president of the Free Software Foundation Europe Karsten Gerloff attended LinuxTag. A focal point was "business processes using Linux" and "Open Source Software in the colours of the Tricolor" for which 14 Open Source Software suppliers from France displayed their product and service ranges.

==== LinuxTag 2010 ====
LinuxTag 2010 took place from 9 to 12 June 2010 at the Messe Berlin. This 16th LinuxTag was attended by about 11,600 people and stood under the patronage of Cornelia Rogall-Grothe, Federal Government Commissioner for Information Technology. Keynote speakers included Microsoft's general manager James Utzschneider who stunned the audience with his open approach to Open Source Software, the CEO of SugarCRM, Larry Augustin, who underlined the economic impact of FLOSS and its leverage in cloud computing, the "director of open source" at Google, Chris DiBona, who underlined the professional level of LinuxTag, the kernel developer Jonathan Corbet who gave an outlook on the next Linux kernel 2.6.35, and Ubuntu founder Mark Shuttleworth laid out the next milestones for the Ubuntu desktop distribution.

==== LinuxTag 2011 ====
The 17th LinuxTag was held from 11 to 14 May 2011 at the Messe Berlin under the motto "Where .com meets .org". It was attended by 11,578 visitors and was placed under the patronage of Cornelia Rogall-Grothe of the Federal Government Commissioner for Information Technology, again. Keynotes were given by Wim Coekaerts (Oracle), Bradley Kuhn (Software Freedom Conservancy) and Daniel Walsh (Red Hat).

==== LinuxTag 2012 ====
The 18th LinuxTag happened from 23 to 26 May 2012 at the Messe Berlin with the motto "Open minds create effective solutions", another time under the patronage of Cornelia Rogall-Grothe of the German Federal Government Commissioner for Information Technology. At LinuxTag, the "Open MindManager Morning" premiere took place, on which industry experts and educators across the IT discussed changes in society and Open Source philosophy.

In addition, there was the premiere of the new lecture series "Open Minds Economy", organized by the Open Source Business Alliance (OSBA) and Messe Berlin, which presented successful business models and applications of open source software in the fields of economy and society.

Keynotes were given by Jimmy Schulz, chairman of the project group "Interoperability, Standards and Open Source" of the commission for research on internet and digital society of the German Bundestag, Ulrich Drepper, maintainer of the GNU C standard library Glibc and Lars Knoll, employee at Nokia and chief maintainer of the QT library.

==== LinuxTag 2013 ====
The 19th LinuxTag was held from 22 to 25 May 2013 on the Berlin Exhibition Grounds with the motto "In the cloud - triumph of the free software goes on". Again it stood under the patronage of Cornelia Rogall-Grothe, the Federal Government Commissioner for Information Technology.

It was also the premiere of the Open IT Summit, which was organized as a parallel conference at LinuxTag of the Open Source Business Alliance (OSBA) and Messe Berlin with the goal to discuss the topic open source in the business environment. Additionally the OpenStack Day took place in cooperation with the OpenStack Foundation as a first major sub-conference on the subject OpenStack in Europe. The Foundation has its headquarters in the U.S. and sees itself as a global reservoir of the same name, scalable cloud management platform.

Keynotes were given by kernel developer Matthew Garrett on the subject of Unified Extensible Firmware Interface (UEFI) and Secure Boot, and Benjamin Mako Hill, a researcher at the Massachusetts Institute of Technology (MIT), who marked so-called anti-features as unacceptable, where manufacturers build usage restrictions into devices.

==== LinuxTag 2014 ====
Since about 2012, the number of visitors of LinuxTag declined despite the ever increasing use of Open Source Software. This decline in visitor numbers was interpreted as a side effect of the ubiquity of Free Software and Linux, hence not being of extraordinary interest any longer. In addition, for some years, there were many similar regional events, in Germany and other European nations, which have drawn from the concept of LinuxTag.

In order to adapt to the changes, the LinuxTag focused on the core issue of the professional use of Open Source Software, as in 2014. Therefore, LinuxTag started a strategic partnership with the droidcon.

The 20th LinuxTag took place on 8 and 10 May 2014 at the STATION Berlin. In spatial and temporal proximity were the Media Convention Berlin (6 to 7 May), the re:publica (6 to 8 May) and the droidcon (8 to 10 May 2014). All events aimed towards a close relationship in order to achieve a high level of appreciation of the combined effort.
