= List of remastering software =

The following is a list of remastering and slipstreaming software articles on Wikipedia:

== Windows utilities ==
Name	Supported operating systems								
Name	Windows 2000	Windows XP	Windows Server 2003	Windows Vista	Windows 7	Windows Server 2008	Windows Server 2008 R2	Windows 8	Windows 10
98lite	No	No	No	No	No	No	No	No	No
Autostreamer	No	Yes	Yes	No	No	No	No	No	No
XPLite	Yes	Yes	No	No	No	No	No	No	No
HFSLIP	Yes	Yes	Yes	No	No	No	No	No	No
DriverPacks	Yes	Yes	Yes	No	No	No	No	No	Yes

-*Not fully supported.

== Linux utilities ==
Name	Supported operating system	Last Code Update	Code Repositories/Forks
Mklivecd	All Linux distributions	2018-05-04	GitHub
MyLiveCD	PCLinuxOS and derivatives	2013-04-17	Sourceforge
Remastersys	Debian and derivatives	2016-07-25	GitHub

== See also ==
- Comparison of disk cloning software
