= List of wireless community networks by region =

This is a list of Community networks around the world.

== Africa ==
=== DRC ===
Mesh Bukavu

Pamoja Net

=== Ghana ===
Akwapim Community Wireless Network

=== Somalia ===
Abaarso

=== South Africa ===
Rural Telehealth

Orange Farm:

Zenzeleni:

Home of Compassion

=== Tanzania ===
Sengerema Wireless Community Network

=== Kenya ===
TunapandaNET Community Network

=== Tunisia ===
Mesh SAYADA

== Asia ==
- Nepal Wireless Networking Project

== Oceania ==
=== Australia ===
- Air Stream Wireless
- Melbourne Wireless
- TasWireless, Tasmania

== Europe ==
=== Austria ===
FunkFeuer

=== Czechia ===
cs:CZFree.Net

=== Germany ===
- Freifunk

=== Greece ===
- Athens Wireless Metropolitan Network
- Wireless Thessaloniki
- Sarantaporo.gr Wireless Community Network

=== Ireland ===
- CRCWN Cavan Rural Community Wireless Network. Free Wi-Fi and Fixed Wireless Internet.

(www.crcwn.online)

=== Italy ===
- ninux
- Progetto Neco

=== Netherlands ===
- Wireless Leiden

=== Poland ===
Hyperboria PL (hyperboria.net.pl)

=== Portugal ===
- Wirelesspt

=== Slovenia ===
- wlan slovenija

=== Spain ===
- guifi.net

=== Sweden ===
- Pjodd

=== United Kingdom ===
- Southampton Open Wireless Network

== Americas ==
=== North America ===
==== Canada ====
ZAP Sherbrooke

==== Nova Scotia ====
- Chebucto Community Network, Halifax Regional Municipality

===== Ontario =====
- Toronto Mesh
- Wireless Toronto
- Wireless Nomad, Ontario and Toronto

===== Québec =====
- ZAP Sherbrooke, Sherbrooke

==== Cuba ====
- SNET (abbreviation of "Street Network"), nationwide underground community network

==== United States ====
===== Arizona =====
- Tucson Mesh, Tucson

===== California =====
- People's Open Network, Oakland

===== Illinois =====
- Champaign-Urbana Community Wireless Network

===== Minnesota =====
- Minneapolis wireless internet network

===== New York =====
- NYC Mesh
- Red Hook Wi-Fi

===== Oregon =====
- Personal Telco, Portland, OR

===== Vermont =====
- Newport Wireless Mesh, Newport City, Vermont

===== Washington =====
- Seattle Wireless
- Seattle Community Network

===== West Virginia =====
- West Virginia Broadband

=== South America ===
==== Argentina ====
- Altermundi

==== Brazil ====
- Coolab

== See also ==
- Computer network
- Metropolitan area network
- Wireless community network
- Wireless mesh network
- Wireless user group
