= Wirelesspt =

WirelessPT.net logo

Wirelesspt is a non-commercial open grassroots initiative to support free computer networks that is not dependent of central infrastructure, corporation or entity which is done by the ordinary citizen provide free, open and democratic access to the highways of information technologies helping people and organizations implementing wireless networks that will benefit their communities.

The project also invests in investigating free, open source, digital, information and telecommunication technologies as well as to promote, educate and supply technological information to teach and educate its surrounding social environment about the importance of online privacy and security.

WirelessPT is also part of an international movement for wireless community networks in Europe. The Project counts with local communities and was started in the community of Moitas Venda in Portugal.

== Goals ==
The main goal of WirelessPT is to build a large scale free wireless Wi-Fi network that is decentralized and owned by those who run it and to support local communication. The project is governed by its own agreement which was inspired in the Pico peering Agreement where participants agree upon a network that is free from discrimination and upholds net neutrality. Among other communities like guifi.net and freifunk, WirelessPT has and shares similarities.

Among several goals the project includes:

- Development of mesh networks for communities built by the ordinary citizen
- Foster free access to communication technologies
- Establish wireless connectivity with other communities and regions
- Sharing and developing technological communication resources with and for their communities
- Promote, educate and provide technical information on wireless networks to communities environment about the importance of online privacy, security and democracy.

== Technology ==
Like many other free community-driven networks, Wirelesspt uses mesh technology to bring up ad hoc networks by interconnecting multiple Wireless LANs using mobile ad hoc network technology and a special routing software.

If one of these routers fail, this special software automatically calculates a new path to the final destination. This software is called mvwrt firmware. It is based on OpenWrt and other free software such as LEDE and was specifically designed for the needs and challenges of the project.

There are many different developed versions of the firmware depending on the hardware and protocols that local communities decide to use. Having previously tested olsr, WirelessPT decided to work with Ad Hoc and the B.A.T.M.A.N. routing protocol as the firmware base routing protocol.

== History ==
Founded in January 2011 in Portugal after 2 years of planning the project was first started by its founder with a setup of 9 nodes and 5 gateways in 3 weeks to cover an area of 6 square kilometres using ddwrt firmware.

In 2013 the project developed its own firmware and expanded their nodes count as well as coverage until today and became a registered national trademark in 2016 after participating in the Battlemesh v9 event.

The project is currently active and stable because the wireless kit is designed for installation on standard wireless routers, allowing nodes to function automatically once the firmware is uploaded.

During its development of the project, it also created one of the reliable sources as considered for dyi wireless documentation that can be found online offering solutions for small to large projects.
