= NYC Mesh =

Community-owned mesh network

- Type: Data
- Location: New York, NY
- Current status: Development
- Commercial?: No
- Website: nycmesh.net
- ASN: 395853
- Peering policy: Open

NYC Mesh is a physical network of interconnected routers and a group of enthusiasts working to support the expansion of the project as a freely accessible, open, wireless community network. NYC Mesh is not an Internet service provider (ISP), although it does connect to the internet and offer internet access as a service to members. The network includes over 2,000 active member nodes throughout the five boroughs of New York City, with concentrations of users in Manhattan and Brooklyn.

== Aim ==
The goal of NYC Mesh is to build a large scale, decentralized digital network, owned by those who run and use it, that will eventually cover all of New York City and neighboring urban areas.

Participation in the project is governed by its Network Commons License. This agreement, partially modeled on a similar license in use by Guifi.net, lists four key tenets:

- Participants are free to use the network for any purpose that does not limit the freedom of others to do the same,
- Participants are free to know how the network and its components function,
- Participants are free to offer and accept services on the network on their own terms, and
- By joining the free network, participants agree to extend the network to others under the same conditions.

Other similar projects include Freifunk in Germany; Ninux in Italy; Sarantaporo.gr in Greece; the People's Open Network in Oakland, California; Philly Community Wireless in Philadelphia, Pennsylvania; Seattle Community Network in Seattle, Washington; Tuscon Mesh in Tuscon; and Red Hook Wi-Fi in Brooklyn, New York.

== Technology ==
Like many other free community-driven networks, NYC Mesh uses mesh technology to facilitate robustness and resiliency. NYC Mesh previously used BGP for routing within the network, though this was found to be too static so the network was changed to use OSPF routing instead.

The network relies on a variety of wireless links to connect individual nodes and larger sections of the network together. Most nodes use both a long range directional antenna for up-link to a hub along with a shorter range omni-directional antenna that provides connections to other nearby nodes. This omni-directional antenna also includes a router and 5 port network switch.

From the roof, cables are run to each apartment which is provided with Wi-Fi from an indoor Wi-Fi access point. Each node can support up to 4 apartments by itself, but can be upgraded to support more with additional equipment.

== History ==
In 2012, a group called "NYC Meshnet" was formed to experiment with the Cjdns mesh protocol. This was the precursor to NYC Mesh.

In 2014, NYC Mesh was launched with a new website and the first antennas were installed using firmware from Guifi.

In 2015 NYC Mesh received a grant from ISOC-NY, the New York chapter of the Internet Society.

On July 15, 2019, NYC Mesh incorporated as a nonprofit organization. On August 21, 2020, the Internal Revenue Service issued NYC Mesh a determination letter of its 501(c)(3) status, retroactive to its incorporation date.

NYC Mesh initially connected to the internet via the DE-CIX internet exchange point (IXP) at its first supernode, Sabey Data Centers at 375 Pearl Street, peering with companies such as Akamai, Apple, Google, and Hurricane Electric. Later, another supernode was opened up on the roof of the DataVerge (formerly ColoGuard) datacenter in Industry City, Brooklyn.

The project received a membership boost due to the U.S. Federal Communications Commission vote in December 2017 to repeal its 2015 net neutrality rules. Coinciding with this decision, the average number of member sign-ups requests per month jumped from about 20 to over 400.

In 2026 NYC Mesh won a $898,035 grant through the New York (state) ConnectALL program's Connectivity Innovation – Business Model Awards. The money was slated to be used for hiring their first full time staff member, expanding the network's reach, and installing Mesh internet in low income households..

== See also ==
- DIY networking
- Mesh networking
- Net neutrality
- Freifunk
- Guifi.net
