= Wireless Thessaloniki =

- Network Name (short): wthess
- Location: salonica, Greece
- Home page: http://www.wthess.net/
- Nodes database: wthess database
- Active users: approx. 100
- Operational: Yes
- Commercial: No

Wireless Thessaloniki is an experimental wireless community network growing in the air of Thessaloniki, Greece. It is one of the first wireless networks deployed in the city.

It was founded by Konstantinos Natsakis and Athanasios Kanaris in November 2002. The primary goals of this project was twofold:

- Development of a floppy linux distribution that would provide encryption better than WEP
- Construction of low-cost antennas and routers based on old PCs, placed in water resist boxes in order to be placed on rooftops

The linux floppy distribution formed, named Paladir, was named after the palantíri in J. R. R. Tolkien's The Lord of the Rings, as it provided insight to other wireless routers running Paladir.

The first wireless link, connecting two points with distance of 4.5 km, was achieved on March 1, 2003, in 11 Mbit/s.

Since then, the wthess network counts more than 20 nodes sparged on rooftops of the city. It is connected with TWMN and SWN to provide connectivity with other community networks, and it is also connected through wired network with AWMN and other wireless communities in Greece.

== See also ==
- Athens Wireless Metropolitan Network
