= Subramanian Ramanathan =

IRE

Subramanian Ramanathan is an electrical engineer at Raytheon BBN Technologies in Cambridge, Massachusetts. He was named a Fellow of the Institute of Electrical and Electronics Engineers (IEEE) in 2012 for his contributions to mobile ad hoc networks using topology control and directional antennas.
