= Wireless Toronto =

Non-profit community wireless network in Toronto

- Formation: 2005
- Website: http://www.wirelesstoronto.ca/

Wireless Toronto is a volunteer not-for-profit community wireless network in Toronto. Wireless Toronto began in 2005 with the goal of setting up no-cost public wireless Internet access around the Greater Toronto Area and exploring ways to use Wi-Fi technology to strengthen local community and culture. At its peak, Wireless Toronto hotspots served over 1000 connections per day at 38 individual locations.

Wireless Toronto hotspots are created using Linksys WRT54G or Motorola WR850G wireless routers running OpenWrt and WifiDog.

== Other free wireless services in the GTA ==
- The Toronto Public Library (TPL) offers free public wireless access in all of its 99 branches.
- The Markham Public Libraries (MPL) offers free public wireless access in the Angus Glen Library, the Markham Village Library, the Thornhill Community Library, and the Unionville Library
- Viva offers free wireless access on its Rapid Transit Vehicles
- TOwifi offers a free Wi-Fi hotspot map

== See also ==
- Municipal wireless network
- List of wireless community networks by region
