= Freifunk =

Wireless community network initiative

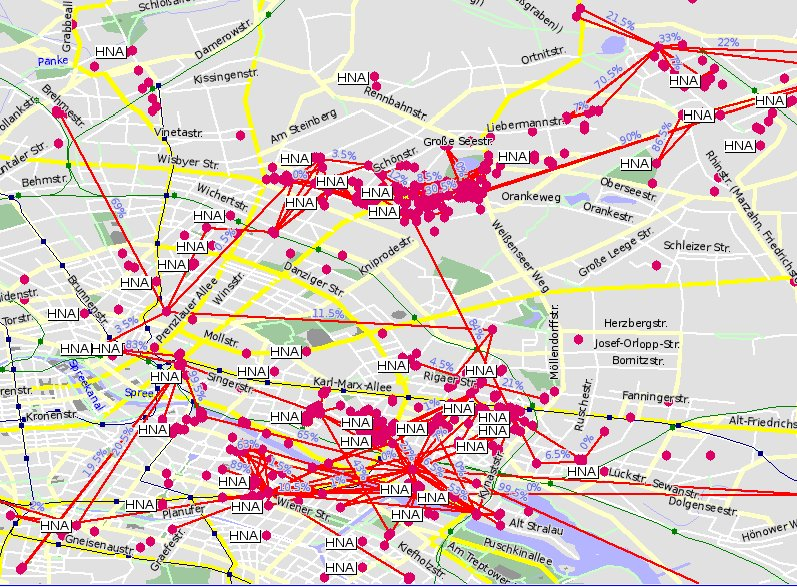
- Connections between nodes in Berlin
- Type: Data
- Location: Germany
- Established: September 2003; 23 years ago
- Current status: Active
- Commercial?: No
- Website: freifunk.net

Freifunk (German for: "free radio") is a non-commercial open grassroots initiative to support free computer networks in the German region. Freifunk is part of the international movement for a wireless community network. The initiative counts about 400 local communities with over 41,000 access points. Among them, Münster, Aachen, Munich, Hanover, Stuttgart, and Uelzen are the biggest communities, with more than 1,000 access points each.

== Aim ==
The main goals of Freifunk are to build a large-scale free wireless Wi-Fi network that is decentralized, owned by those who run it and to support local communication. The initiative is based on the Picopeering Agreement. In this agreement, participants agree upon a network that is free from discrimination, in the sense of net neutrality. Similar grassroots initiatives in Austria and in Switzerland are FunkFeuer and Openwireless.

== Technology ==
Like many other free community-driven networks, Freifunk uses mesh technology to bring up ad hoc networks by interconnecting multiple Wireless LANs. In a Wi-Fi mobile ad hoc network, all routers connect to each other using special routing software. When a router fails, this software automatically calculates a new route to the destination. This software, the Freifunk firmware, is based on OpenWrt and other free software.

There are several different implementations of the firmware depending on the hardware and protocols local communities use. The first Wi-Fi ad hoc network was done in Georgia, USA in 1999 as demonstrated by Toh. It was a six-node implementation running the Associativity-based routing protocol on Linux kernel and WAVELAN WiFi. But ABR was a patented protocol. Following that experience, Freifunk worked on standard IETF protocols - the two common standard proposals are OLSR and B.A.T.M.A.N. The development of B.A.T.M.A.N. is driven by Freifunk activists on a volunteering basis.

== History ==
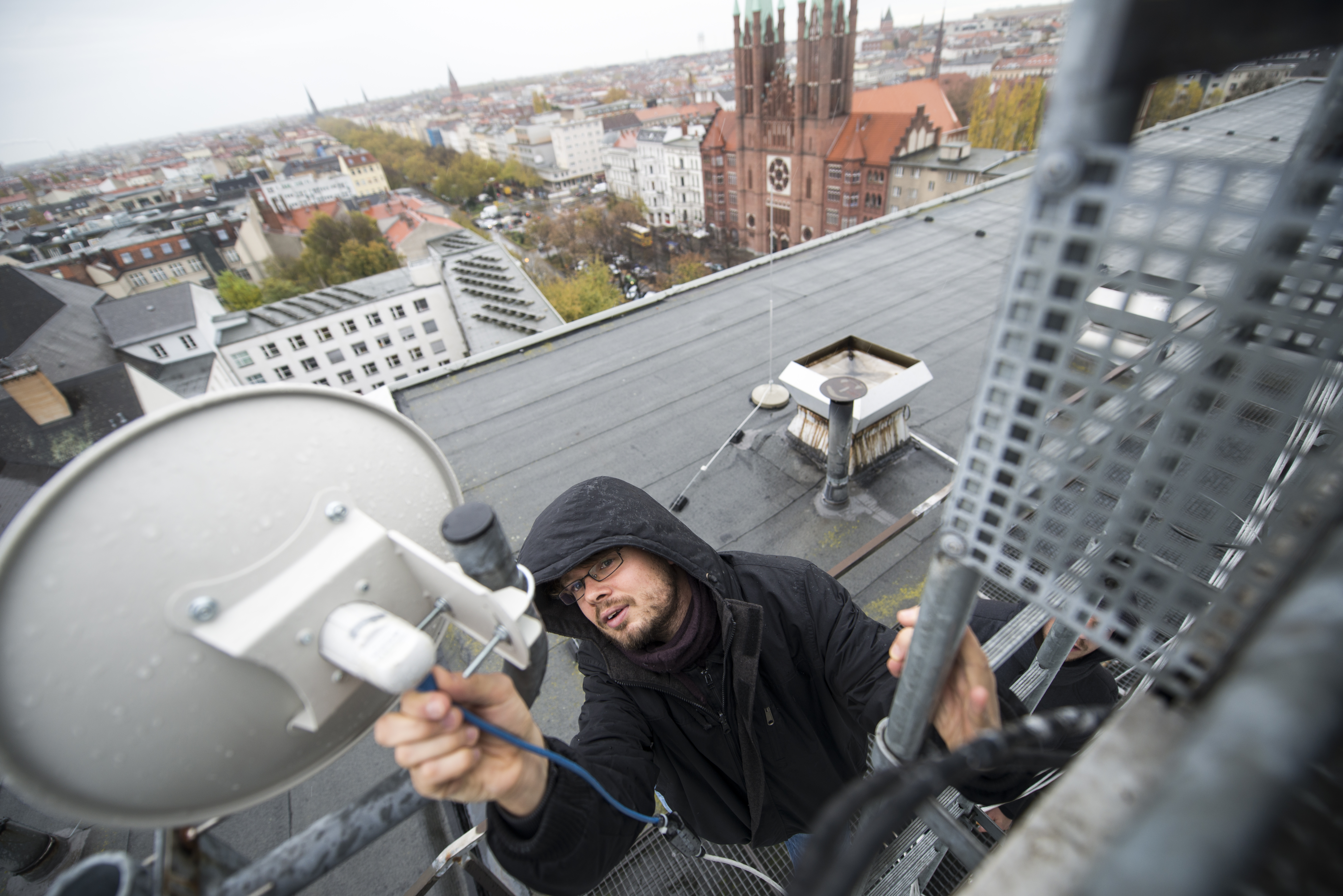
The Freifunk-Initiative installing Wi‑Fi antennas in Berlin-Kreuzberg in 2013

One of the results of the BerLon workshop in October 2002 on free wireless community networks in Berlin and London was the Picopeering Agreement. This agreement about rationales of free networks describes how the transmission of other people's data is handled in a free network and has become a core agreement of the community. During the workshop, participants also agreed upon regular meetings in Berlin to build their own free wifi network. Ever since, there have been weekly meetings at c-base Hackerspace every Wednesday. At the same time, the German language site freifunk.net was started.

In September 2003, Freifunk activists founded the non-profit association Förderverein Freie Netzwerke e.V. to support free communication infrastructures.

In the following years, the initiative became quite successful all over Germany, also because it became easier to install the Freifunk firmware on off-the-shelf wireless routers. There is a yearly Wireless Community Weekend taking place in Berlin, at c-base.

== Legal issues ==
In 2012, the Berlin Freifunk community got a lot of media attention for a project called Freifunk Freedom Fighter Box. The project fights secondary liability: Secondary liability is the legal situation that makes the owners of open / non-encrypted wireless access points liable for what other users do over their internet connection (i.e. guilty until proven innocent), as outlined in the Störerhaftung law, part of the Telemediengesetz Act as last ratified in 2007. The owners can thus be forced to pay for copyright infringements of third persons just because they opened their network to the public. This legal practice led to fear and uncertainty and made many people and businesses close their Internet and Wi-Fi access points, e.g. in cafés or in public locations. The Freifunk Freedom Fighter Box was a preconfigured access point that sent all data from the public network to Sweden over a VPN connection. In Sweden (as in most other countries), there is no secondary liability. The situation regarding secondary liability was only clarified in 2016–18 as a result of several legal rulings by the European Court of Justice (ECJ), and the Bundesgerichtshof which drastically restricted the scope of secondary liability in Germany and therefore made it legally feasible to put up public Wi-Fi hotspots in Germany again.

== Outcome ==
In 2013, the Hamburg Freifunk community set up a network of more than 300 nodes, using VPN tunnels to the Netherlands. Many new Freifunk communities emerged. In Berlin, the community is building a backbone network based on microwave transmission over longer distances. This project is funded by the local broadcasting corporation Medienanstalt Berlin-Brandenburg and is still on-going in Germany.

== See also ==
- Netsukuku
- Mesh networking
- Guifi.net
- NYC Mesh
