= RedLibre =

RedLibre is a non-profit project in which a combination of people, groups, entities, administrations or companies interested in the development and/or use of networks create a free, community data network that allows users to contribute content and share resources, among other uses.

RedLibre has been connected mainly to Wireless Communities, being a point of union and synergy for them. RedLibre also facilitates the tasks that the different organizations involved decide to perform together.

== History ==
The RedLibre project was created in September 2001 by Jaime Robles, based on the philosophy of the “Open Source” initiative. It was the first free network project in Spain and was inspired by similar movements that were appearing in the United States, such as New York Wireless and Seattle Wireless.

RedLibre was born with a much wider range than a “wireless city”, because it was evaluated that a project of this type would need many people (critical mass) to be able to succeed. Instead of creating a local project, the objective was to create a widespread project in which all Spanish-speaking people could gather and share ideas, projects, and more.

Later on, the National Association of Wireless Network Users (ANURI) was formed with the goal of offering legal support to the users of this type of network.

Since the inception of RedLibre in 2001-2002, hundreds of wireless communities have appeared worldwide. Many users registered domains and created websites with “su_pueblowireless.net” or “su_ciudadwireless.” Many online communities saw RedLibre as a threat, seeing it as a project that intended to control the free networks in Spain. These issues slowed the growth and development of free networks in Spain since efforts were divided into small groups that worked independently, without the common goal of generating a free network.

When the issues with communities appeared (because everyone wanted to go off on their own), RedLibre changed its initial direction to try to adapt to the circumstances. Instead of directing itself as a community for people to unite and create a single project, it became a meta-community where support, media, and infrastructure were given to smaller groups. Communities that believed in a common free network gathered together and tried to agree on standardized goals, requirements, and actions.

In December of 2002, the City Council of Gran Canaria organized a meeting of free network communities in Las Palmas. Representatives from many local communities attended the meeting. The first-hand knowledge and the power of speech worked to bring positions closer together.

Devices that had been modified to work internally with Linux systems, referred to as LinuxAP, started to be used. These devices provided flexibility and an endless amount of new possibilities.

By 2003, many of the communities created in previous years had disappeared, and RedLibre also observed a lack of people and the circulation of mailing lists. There has always been a series of problems to solve in wireless communities:

- A lack of action, feeling of community, and teamwork.
- A lack of coordination between communities.
- Excessive expectations?

All of these problems had greatly diminished the number of communities that were active or growing.

In early 2004, with the arrival of new devices using Linux by Linksys and new firmware capable of equipping simple household wireless networks with capacities that none of the expensive professional routers had, RedLibre gave another boost to the creation of communities. Many members of RedLibre collaborated to create new firmware for Linksys routers or to improve existing ones (special mention to the ValenciaWireless team with their version of OpenWrt-eh or the DD-Guifi by Guifi.net).

In 2005 history repeated itself; many communities were once again isolated due to the lack of general collaboration, information, or experience. In addition, there was a technical problem with the RedLibre website and the partial loss of Web content or mailing lists with information from past years.

In 2006, a group of people returned to revive RedLibre, migrating the website from the old Phpnuke portal to the new Drupal CMS. These changes did not just apply to the Web or lists; the true intention was to revamp and update the project, with the experience that many years had given its members.

2007 was marked by several long discussions about what path RedLibre should take; about definitions of free networks or the adoption of a license that defines in-writing what a free wireless network really is (WirelessCommons). Thanks to the help of several volunteers, the Web began to have some movement.

== Goals ==
- Create a free network:

A free network is a network (in this case wireless) created, run, and managed by the users themselves. A free network is widespread; it does not belong to anyone in particular, but belongs to everyone. RedLibre offers free-of-charge access to one’s own network. Free access means that any person can gain access to any part of the network, at any moment.

- Bring technology closer to society and promote communication:

A free network promotes the technical training of users and brings new technologies closer to citizens, eliminating many of the barriers that currently exist in the full development of the information society. It also creates new channels of communication between people in a completely free way.

- Create an emergency network for use in the event of disaster:

In the event of disaster and the consequent collapse of regular communication networks, the free network would be an alternative communication that does not depend on regular transmission media and allows connection to the network at any and all moments. This allows RedLibre to serve as an emergency network and to attend to the needs for communication or voice and data transmission that may arise.
