= Intelligent vehicular ad hoc network =

Vehicle communication standard

Intelligent vehicular ad hoc networks (InVANETs) use WiFi IEEE 802.11p (WAVE standard) and effective communication between vehicles with dynamic mobility. Effective measures such as media communication between vehicles can be enabled as well methods to track automotive vehicles. InVANET is not foreseen to replace current mobile (cellular phone) communication standards.

"Older" designs within the IEEE 802.11 scope may refer just to IEEE 802.11b/g. More recent designs refer to the latest issues of IEEE 802.11p (WAVE, draft status). Due to inherent lag times, only the latter one in the IEEE 802.11 scope is capable of coping with the typical dynamics of vehicle operation.

Automotive vehicular information can be viewed on electronic maps using the Internet or specialized software. The advantage of WiFi based navigation system function is that it can effectively locate a vehicle which is inside big campuses like universities, airports, and tunnels. InVANET can be used as part of automotive electronics, which has to identify an optimally minimal path for navigation with minimal traffic intensity. The system can also be used as a city guide to locate and identify landmarks in a new city.

Communication capabilities in vehicles are the basis of an envisioned InVANET or intelligent transportation systems (ITS). Vehicles are enabled to communicate among themselves (vehicle-to-vehicle, V2V) and via roadside access points (vehicle-to-roadside, V2R) also called as Road Side Units (RSUs). Vehicular communication is expected to contribute to safer and more efficient roads by providing timely information to drivers, and also to make travel more convenient. The integration of V2V and V2R communication is beneficial because V2R provides better service sparse networks and long-distance communication, whereas V2V enables direct communication for small to medium distances/areas and at locations where roadside access points are not available.

Providing vehicle–vehicle and vehicle–roadside communication can considerably improve traffic safety and comfort of driving and traveling. For communication in vehicular ad hoc networks, position-based routing has emerged as a promising candidate. For Internet access, Mobile IPv6 is a widely accepted solution to provide session continuity and reachability to the Internet for mobile nodes. While integrated solutions for usage of Mobile IPv6 in (non-vehicular) mobile ad hoc networks exist, a solution has been proposed that, built upon a Mobile IPv6 proxy-based architecture, selects the optimal communication mode (direct in-vehicle, vehicle–vehicle, and vehicle–roadside communication) and provides dynamic switching between vehicle–vehicle and vehicle–roadside communication mode during a communication session in case that more than one communication mode is simultaneously available.

== See also ==
- Mobile ad hoc network
- Vehicular ad hoc network
- Simulation of VANETs
- Wireless mesh network

== Research fora ==
- Google Groups – InADVENC
- CiteULike reading group on VANET
