= West Virginia Broadband =

West Virginia Broadband is a Wireless community network located in Braxton County, West Virginia operated by local volunteers and coordinated by the Gilmer-Braxton Research Zone. The effort gained recent attention by a National Public Radio story and MuniWireless and SmartMobs bloggers detailing how modified off-the-shelf Wi-Fi adapters were used to connect 7 communities with wireless internet for a total cost of little more than 4000 US dollars. The research group now coordinates wireless technology training throughout the United States.
