= Athens Wireless Metropolitan Network =

Greek grassroots wireless community network

- Network Name (short): AWMN
- Location: Attica, Greece
- Home page: http://www.awmn.net
- Nodes database: AWMN database
- Active users: (approx.) 1120 backbone + 2900 approx. clients
- Operational: Yes
- Commercial: No

The Athens Wireless Metropolitan Network (AWMN) was a grassroots wireless community network established in 2002 in Athens, Greece. By August 2010, the network had grown to include 1,120 backbone nodes, with over 2,900 client computers actively linked to it. There is also an association-club that supports the network's objectives.

== Cultural and geographical context ==
Although the network began in Athens, the capital of Greece, its activities are no longer limited to the city. It covers a geographical area 110 km from North to South and 85 km from West to East, with the most southern point being Palaia Epidavros (Epidaurus) and the most northern point being the town of Nea Artaki on the island of Euboea. The wide expansion of the network allows isolated areas with poor technological and broadband infrastructure to connect with the Athenian network. The islands of Aegina, Salamina and the regions surrounding Athens are also connected to the network.

Recently the island of Euboea connected with more links with AWMN for redundancy purposes and the next stage will be to join the wireless 'islets' located in Corinth, Lamia (city) and Volos. There are also plans to reach even more remote cities of Greece such as Patras.

This year AWMN connected most of the Greek communities and managed to cross the Greek borders. It has initiated a VPN connection with wlan slovenija network in Slovenia with the vision to connect all the wireless communities of Europe into one network.

== Project history ==
AWMN was formed as a community back in 2002. Due to tremendous problems with broadband services in Greece in 2002 the number of such services available to home users was extremely limited. AWMN was founded as an alternative broadband network, which allowed its users to experience real broadband services.

However, an increasing number of people started to have an interest in the network. The number of network nodes started to grow exponentially, and the network's character changed from an alternative telecom network to a social network of people based on their interest in the IT/Telecom sector.

The objectives of the project include the following:

- Creating, developing and maintaining a Wireless Community Network which will provide broadband services to its members.
- Developing technologies based on wireless and digital telecommunications.
- Educate the public on the use of wireless and digital communications
- Promote and encourage volunteerism and active participation.

The association, as of August 2010, has around 67 members. Not all members of the backbone network are members of the association, and there are around 900 that do not want to participate in the association, due to the extent of moderation and speech censorship that is practiced in the association's forum, wiki and assembly. Participation in the association has, throughout its history, always been on a voluntary basis. No one is obliged to sign a peering agreement as long as it is not needed, and no one has to join the association to participate to the network, rendering the AWMN network one of the most open networks in the world. However all 1080 backbone node owners are obliged to accept responsibility for the smooth running of their node, follow the basic rules of the community and follow basic network neutrality rules.

== The community ==
Users are categorised as backbone nodes and AP client nodes. The backbone nodes are nodes routing data that have no origin and destination themselves.

The network is a mosaic of people from varying ages and educational backgrounds including IT and telecommunications professionals, radio amateurs, IT students and technology enthusiasts. All are driven by a strong community spirit and contribute on a voluntary basis.

== Technology ==
AWMN makes extensive use of the IEEE 802.11 set of standards and operates on the 2.4 GHz (mainly for the Open APs) and 5.4 GHz (for the backbone links) license-free ISM frequency bands. Over the last few years, AWMN has tested (and later used in production environments) equipment from a huge variety of vendors.

The routing protocol used by the network is BGP. Efforts have been made to move towards new, more adaptive, experimental protocols such as OLSR and B.A.T.M.A.N. Some members of the AWMN community have contributed feedback and code to many Linux routing projects.

Homemade equipment is encouraged. Many workshops have been held so that members can become familiar with constructing their own aerials and cables. Additionally, the community regularly organizes seminars to educate aspiring network administrators on wireless technologies, protocols, routing and Linux, in the conditions of an operational large-scale network.

A wide variety of software is used in the network but AWMN services rely heavily on open-source software, Linux (or other free Unix variants).

== Services ==
The network currently provides a full-featured internal VoIP network, High Definition streaming services, game servers, file sharing services, hundreds of users/nodes webpages, network statistics services, routing, network monitoring, weather stations and VPN servers.

WiND is a web application for wireless community networks, such as AWMN itself, which has been created by members of AWMN. WiND provides a front-end interface to a database where information of the nodes can be stored, such as position details, DNS, IP addressing and a list of provided network services.

== See also ==
- List of wireless community networks
- Wireless network organizations by size
