= Personal Telco =

Oregon wireless community network

Personal Telco Project
- Formation: 2000
- Purpose: Wireless community network
- Location: Portland, Oregon

The Personal Telco Project (or PTP) is a wireless community network project in Portland, Oregon. It was founded by Adam Shand in November 2000 after he read a Slashdot article about the Consume The Net project in London.

PTP has wireless hotspots offering free Internet access at locations around Portland including Pioneer Courthouse Square, three public parks, and several restaurants and coffee shops using Wi-Fi. In 2005 PTP was involved in a grant-funded project to bring free wireless Internet to an entire neighborhood in North Portland, along N. Mississippi Avenue.

PTP is a non-profit organization in the state of Oregon, and received its 501(c)(3) status (a federal tax exemption granted to charitable organizations) in early 2003.

PTP made US news in August 2002 when their hotspot at Pioneer Courthouse Square was blocked by a for-fee hotspot at a nearby Starbucks coffee shop. The problem was resolved amicably when the for-fee hotspot moved their connection to another channel.

On March 4, 2003, a study was published stating Portland had more wireless hotspots per capita than any other U.S. city. This was due in part to PTP's advocacy.
