= Expected transmission count =

Network routing metric

The ETX metric, or expected transmission count, is a measure of the quality of a path between two nodes in a wireless packet data network. It is widely utilized in mesh networking algorithms.

== History ==
Douglas S.J. De Couto was the first to describe ETX in his 2004 doctoral dissertation at MIT. Subsequently, it has been implemented in RoofNet/Meraki and OLSR mesh networking protocols, among others.

In the context of the OLSR protocol, a bidirectional link ETX was defined.

== Details ==
ETX is the number of expected transmissions of a packet necessary for it to be received without error at its destination. This number varies from one to infinity. An ETX of one indicates a perfect transmission medium, where an ETX of infinity represents a completely non-functional link. Note that ETX is an expected transmission count for a future event, as opposed to an actual count of a past event. It is hence a real number, and not an integer. For example, if it took 1898 transmissions to transfer 1024 packets without error, the ETX on the link is 1898/1024, or approximately 1.85. Due to varying characteristics of the transmission medium, the number may vary widely.

It is often useful to convert between ETX and the packet error probability $e_{pt}$:

$$\mathrm{ETX} = \frac{1}{1 - e_{pt}}$$

An equivalent relation is used for bidirectional links in the context of the OLSR protocol: $ETX = 1/(NLQ * LQ)$ where NLQ is the Neighbor Link Quality of the link and LQ is its link quality. Thus, $e_{pt} = 1-NLQ * LQ$.
