= ZAP Sherbrooke =

ZAP Sherbrooke (ZAP stands for "Public Access Zone" in French") is a non-profit community wireless network which provides free wireless Internet access to mobile users in public spaces throughout the city of Sherbrooke, Quebec, Canada. The network was built using Open-source software and inexpensive off-the-shelf Wi-Fi hardware to share broadband Internet connections. The initiative was created by a consortium of Sherbrooke University and Bishop's University along with hospitals and other colleges in the area. In 2008 the project received the OCTAS Award for "Technologies at the Service of Communities".

ZAP Sherbrooke is available throughout Sherbrooke city in public areas (public parks, arenas, library, city buildings) as well as universities (Sherbrooke University and Bishop's University) and hospitals. It is also available in cafés, restaurants, bars, stores, and community organizations which pay a $200 fee the first year and $75 each subsequent year to join the network. As of March 2010, the network has over 35,000 registered users and over 240 live hotspots.
