= Wireless Leiden =

Dutch wireless community network

Wireless Leiden is a wireless community network in Leiden, Netherlands.

== History ==
The Wireless Leiden Foundation (founded in 2002) set up a Wi-Fi wireless network in Leiden, the Netherlands, only with the help of volunteers, with some financial support by sponsors. The network is maintained completely by volunteers.

The network is accessible for free for everybody who wants to use it. This is possible because there are no expenses of any importance, as the volunteers who build and maintain the network do not receive any payment for their contribution and the materials needed were donated. The software used in the network is completely open source. Internet provider Demon Internet, donates free Internet access to the foundation. The Internet connection is, however, limited to the downloading of web pages. The network can be used at homes, schools and public buildings (like libraries). In many places in Leiden, it is advisable to use an external antenna. In the city center, however, on most places a laptop antenna is enough to access the network. Wireless Leiden has been called one of the most advanced community Wi-Fi networks in the world. Wireless Leiden was published as a case study of a Wi-Fi based community network in 2010. Stefan Verhaegh of the University of Twente analyzed the "Wireless Leiden" case in his 2010 PhD thesis.

In February 2022, it was announced that the Wi-Fi network would be phased out due to diminished usage and cost of maintaining the network.
