= B.A.T.M.A.N. =

Routing protocol for multi-hop mobile ad hoc networks

- Developer: Freifunk
- Initial release: batmand 0.1 (6 December 2006; 19 years ago)
- Stable release: Batman-adv 2025.4 / 24 October 2025; 2 months ago
- Written in: C
- Operating system: Unix-like
- Type: routing protocol
- License: GPL
- Website: www.open-mesh.org

The Better Approach to Mobile Ad-hoc Networking (B.A.T.M.A.N.) is a routing protocol for multi-hop mobile ad hoc networks which is under development by the German "Freifunk" community and intended to replace the Optimized Link State Routing Protocol (OLSR) as OLSR did not meet the performance requirements of large-scale mesh deployments.

B.A.T.M.A.N.'s crucial point is the decentralization of knowledge about the best route through the network — no single node has all the data. This technique eliminates the need to spread information about network changes to every node in the network. The individual node only saves information about the "direction" it received data from and sends its data accordingly. The data gets passed from node to node, and packets get individual, dynamically created routes. A network of collective intelligence is created.

In early 2007, the B.A.T.M.A.N. developers started experimenting with the idea of routing on Data Link layer (layer 2 in the OSI model) rather than the Network layer. To differentiate from the layer 3 routing daemon, the suffix "adv" (for: advanced) was chosen. Instead of manipulating routing tables based on information exchanged via UDP/IP, it provides a virtual network interface and transparently transports Ethernet packets on its own. The batman-adv kernel module has been part of the official Linux kernel since 2.6.38.

== Operation ==
B.A.T.M.A.N. has elements of classical routing protocols: It detects other B.A.T.M.A.N. nodes and finds the best way (route) between nodes. It also keeps track of new nodes and informs its neighbors about their existence.

In static networks, network administrators or technicians decide which computer is reached via which way or cable. As radio networks undergo constant changes and low participation-thresholds are a vital part of the "Freifunk"-networks' foundation, this task has to be automated as much as possible.

On a regular basis, every node sends out a broadcast, thereby informing all its neighbors about its existence. The neighbors then relay this message to their neighbors, and so on. This carries the information to every node in the network. In order to find the best route to a certain node, B.A.T.M.A.N. counts the originator-messages received and logs which neighbor the message came in through.

Like distance-vector protocols, B.A.T.M.A.N. does not try to determine the entire route, but by using the originator-messages, only the packet's first step in the right direction. The data is handed to the next neighbor in that direction, which in turn uses the same mechanism. This process is repeated until the data reaches its destination.

In addition to radio networks, B.A.T.M.A.N. can also be used with common wired cable connections, such as Ethernet.

== History ==
The task was to create a protocol which was to be as easy, as small and as fast as possible. It seemed sensible to split the development in several phases and implement complex functions using an iterative process:

=== Version one ===
In the first phase, the routing algorithm was implemented and tested for its practicality and suitability for the task at hand. For the sending and receiving of originator-messages (information about existence), the UDP port 1966 was chosen.

=== Version two ===
The version one algorithm made a significant assumption: As soon as a node receives existence data from another node, it assumes it can also send data back. In radio networks however, it may very well be that only one-way communication is possible, i.e., asymmetric links. A mechanism was incorporated into the protocol to allow for this and to solve the arising problems. The mechanism enables the node to determine whether a neighboring node provides bidirectional communication. Only bidirectional nodes are being considered part of the network, and one-way nodes are no longer fully included.

=== Version three ===
The greatest innovation in this version is B.A.T.M.A.N.'s support of multiple network devices. A computer or router running B.A.T.M.A.N. can be deployed in a central location, such as a tall building, and have several wired or wireless network interfaces attached to it. When so deployed, B.A.T.M.A.N. can relay network data in more than one direction without any retransmission delay.

Certain unusual phenomena and special circumstances could appear during the determination of the best route through the network. These have been tackled and counteracted to prevent circular routing (which can prevent data reaching its destination).

A node can inform the network that it provides access to the Internet. Other nodes use this information to evaluate whether there is a connection to the Internet close to them and how much bandwidth is available. They can either use a specific gateway or allow B.A.T.M.A.N. to determine which gateway to use, based on criteria such as connection speed.

Announcing devices not running B.A.T.M.A.N. themselves was also included in this version. Usually, this method is used to connect home networks to mesh-networks. An antenna installation on the roof will connect to the wireless network through B.A.T.M.A.N. and the rest of the building will simply be announced, thus also be reachable.

This version of B.A.T.M.A.N. has been shown to exhibit high levels of stability but slightly slow convergence times in real-world conditions; this is confirmed by theoretical analysis.

=== BMX6 ===
BatMan-eXperimental (BMX) aims to approximate the real exponent by also sending OGMs (originator messages) multiple times in independent broadcast data grams. It originated as an independent branch of BATMAN developed by Axel Neumann. An extended version that incorporates securely-entrusted multi-topology routing (SEMTOR) is called BMX7.

=== IV ===
Version four implements an algorithm to better detect quality of transmissions in abnormal link situations. Originator messages are updated to incorporate this data, enabling other nodes to better sense quality of asymmetric connections. This new metric is called "Transmit Quality (TQ)".

=== V ===
Two main changes were introduced with the fifth version: "separating neighbor discovery from mesh routing" and a change to a throughput-based metric.

A new neighbor discovery protocol, the Echo Location Protocol (ELP), was introduced. Separating neighbor discovery from mesh routing allows for different intervals to be used. Metrics flooded into the mesh should not be updated that often, but local connectivity changes can be adopted faster.

B.A.T.M.A.N. IV used packet loss as the mesh-wide metric. With B.A.T.M.A.N. V, the metric changed to a throughput-based one. This improves the overall performance of the mesh when there are very performant links with low packet loss. In this case, the high-performance links are preferred over the slow but reliable links.

== Public persona ==
In 2017 B.A.T.M.A.N. was written on a whiteboard in the HBO series Silicon Valley (Season 4 Episode 2) where the show's lead character Richard Hendricks appears to include B.A.T.M.A.N. as a component of his "new Internet" concept (the text is visible on the top-right of the whiteboard).

== See also ==
- Netsukuku is a project with similar goals
- Ad hoc On-Demand Distance Vector Routing (AODV)
- Associativity-Based Routing (ABR)
- Dynamic Source Routing (DSR)
- List of ad hoc routing protocols
- List of open source routing platforms
- Mobile ad hoc network (MANET)
- Wireless ad hoc network
