= Seattle Wireless =

Seattle Wireless was an American non-profit project created by Matt Westervelt and Ken Caruso in June 2000. It sought to develop a free, locally owned wireless community network using widely available, license-free technology Wireless broadband Internet access. It is a metropolitan area network. As of 2016, Seattle Wireless is no longer operational.

Seattle Wireless was one of the first Community Wireless Networks and one of the first project focused wikis. It also had a short lived (7 episode) online television show, called Seattle Wireless TV. It was created by Peter Yorke and Michael Pierce and ran July 2003 - June 2004. SWTV was an early adopter of Bittorrent to distribute its shows.
