= Sarantaporo.gr =

Non-profit wireless network community

- Sarantaporo.gr logo
- Website: sarantaporo.gr Map of coverage: "Network map - Sarantaporo.gr". wind.sarantaporo.gr.

Sarantaporo.gr is a non-profit wireless network community founded in 2013 in Elassona Municipality in Greece. The network helps locals organize cooperative work to deploy and operate the wireless network infrastructure, organized as a commons.

The WCN participated in the CONFINE, the netCommons and the MAZI research projects. A documentary presents the networks in the Sarantaporo area.
