= Ad hoc network =

Technology that allows network communications on an ad hoc basis

An ad hoc network refers to technologies that allow network communications on an ad hoc basis. Associated technologies include:

- Wireless ad hoc network
  - Smart phone ad hoc network
  - Vehicular ad hoc network
    - Intelligent vehicular ad hoc network
- Protocols associated with ad hoc networking
  - Ad hoc On-Demand Distance Vector Routing
  - Ad Hoc Configuration Protocol
- Ad hoc wireless distribution service
