= Ninux =

ninux.org
- ninux.org logo
- Website: wiki.ninux.org/FrontPage
- Map of coverage: "Mappa della rete - Ninux.org". map.ninux.org.
- ASN: 197835

Ninux.org is a wireless community network in Italy, a free, open and experimental computer network. The main idea is that users build their own computer network without central control or property, as opposed to traditional Internet service providers (ISP), where a single entity owns and manages the network. The initiative is based on the Ninux manifesto, the Wireless Commons Manifesto and the Picopeering Agreement. In these agreements participants agree upon a network that is free from discrimination, in the sense of net neutrality.

With 352 active nodes and 2216 planned nodes, it is one of the top ten wireless community networks in the world in number of active nodes. Ninux is part of the international movement for open wireless radio networks. For more information on such projects around the world, see wireless community network.

Since 2013, Ninux is an experimental member of the NaMeX Internet Exchange Point in Rome.

== History ==
Ninux was born in Rome around 2002 and has grown to span all over Italy. Its name currently stands for "Neighborhood Internet, Network Under eXperiment". In fact, Ninux.org has been testing devices, auto-built antennas and routing protocols while exchanging knowledge with the other Community Networks in Europe.

Ninux has participated since its early editions in the organization of the Battlemesh. Member since 2014 of the Community-Lab.net testbed.
