= Community project =

Project focused on a community group

A community project is a term applied to any community-based project. This covers a wide variety of different areas within a community or a group of networking entities. Projects can cover almost anything, including the most obvious section of concern to any community, the welfare element. Welfare community projects would for example be, a locally run and locally funded orphanage; a Christmas dinner kitchen for the homeless. Another important sector of importance to the community would be charity. Charitable projects in the community can include, but are not limited to, ecological charities concerned with either the maintenance of green spaces, or in some cases, the prevention of the reduction/removal of green spaces. An old clothes collection service would also be a community-based charity project. One important subdivision of community projects, and at times overlooked, is those of an economic nature such as LETS. The highlight of economic community projects is what is known as Transition Towns. Most economic community projects are designed at creating some sort of economic autonomy.

It begins when a small collection of motivated individuals within a community come together with a shared concern: how can our community respond to the challenges, and opportunities, of peak oil and climate change?

== Scope and size ==
All community projects are different in some way; the size and scope of these projects is determined firstly by the community they cater to.

According to the definition of a community, a community could be the entire human race or parts of it anywhere on the planet. However, because of phenomena like distance decay or demographic factors such as age group, gender and income that determine social identity of groups, the extent of community-based projects is usually much more limited.
