= Red Hook Wi-Fi =

Red-Hook Wi-Fi
- Mission statement: Resilience, Opportunity, Community and Social Justice.
- Type of project: Non Commercial
- Products: Mesh Networking
- Location: Red Hook, Brooklyn. United States of America.
- Owner: Red Hook Initiative
- Established: November 2011
- Status: Active
- Website: redhookwifi.org

Red Hook Wi-Fi is a free-to-use, Wi-Fi mesh network that provides internet access to the Red Hook neighborhood of Brooklyn, New York. It is operated by the Red Hook Initiative.

== Background ==
Due to the location of Red Hook, Brooklyn, between the Red Hook Channel and the Buttermilk Channel, many of its residents face various challenges in accessing broadband service. A survey found out that many people in the area accessed the internet primarily through mobile phones and that over 30% of the population did not have broadband access at home.

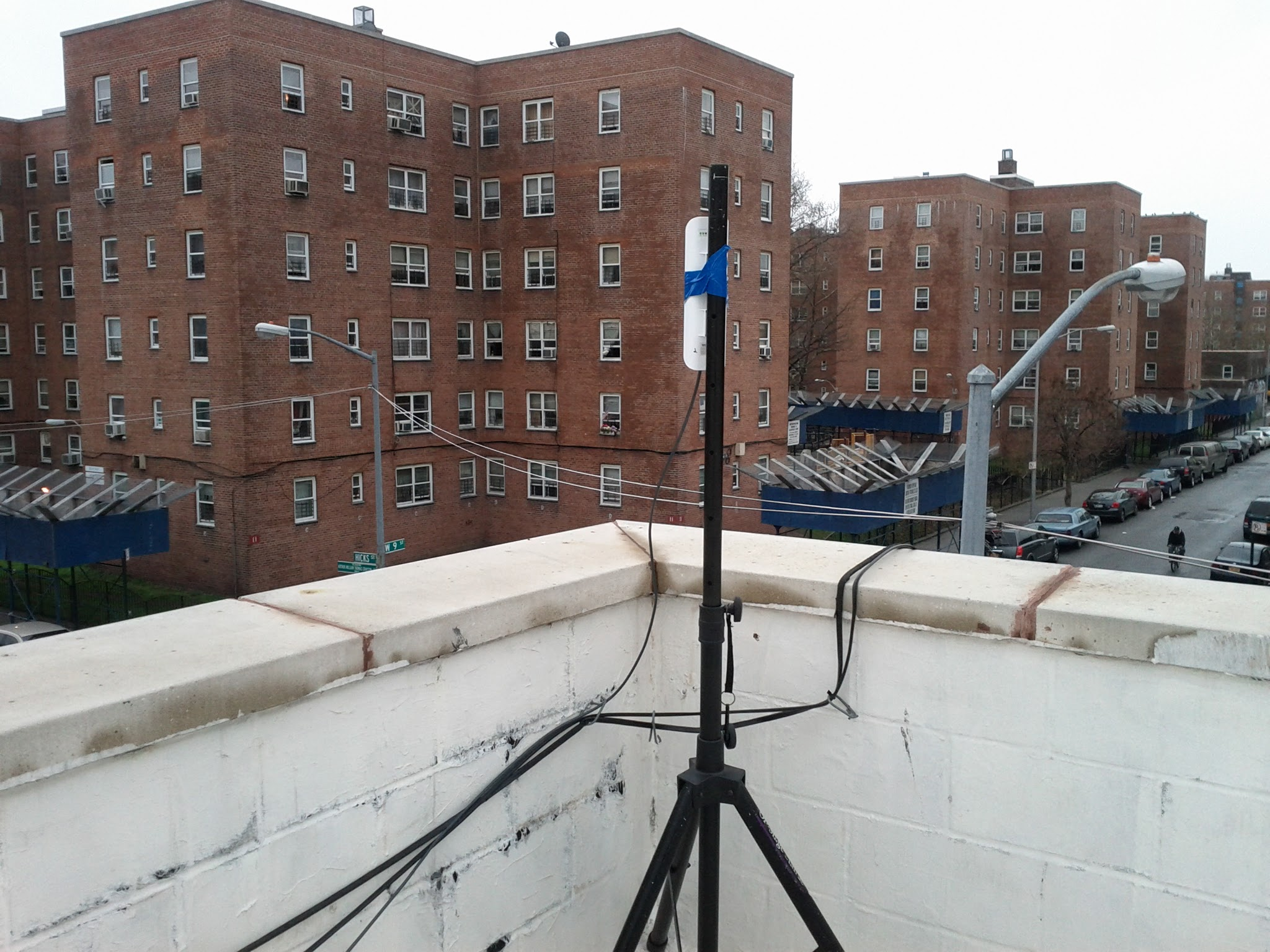
First Red Hook WiFi mesh network node (Ubiquiti Nanostation) installation on the Red Hook Initiative rooftop

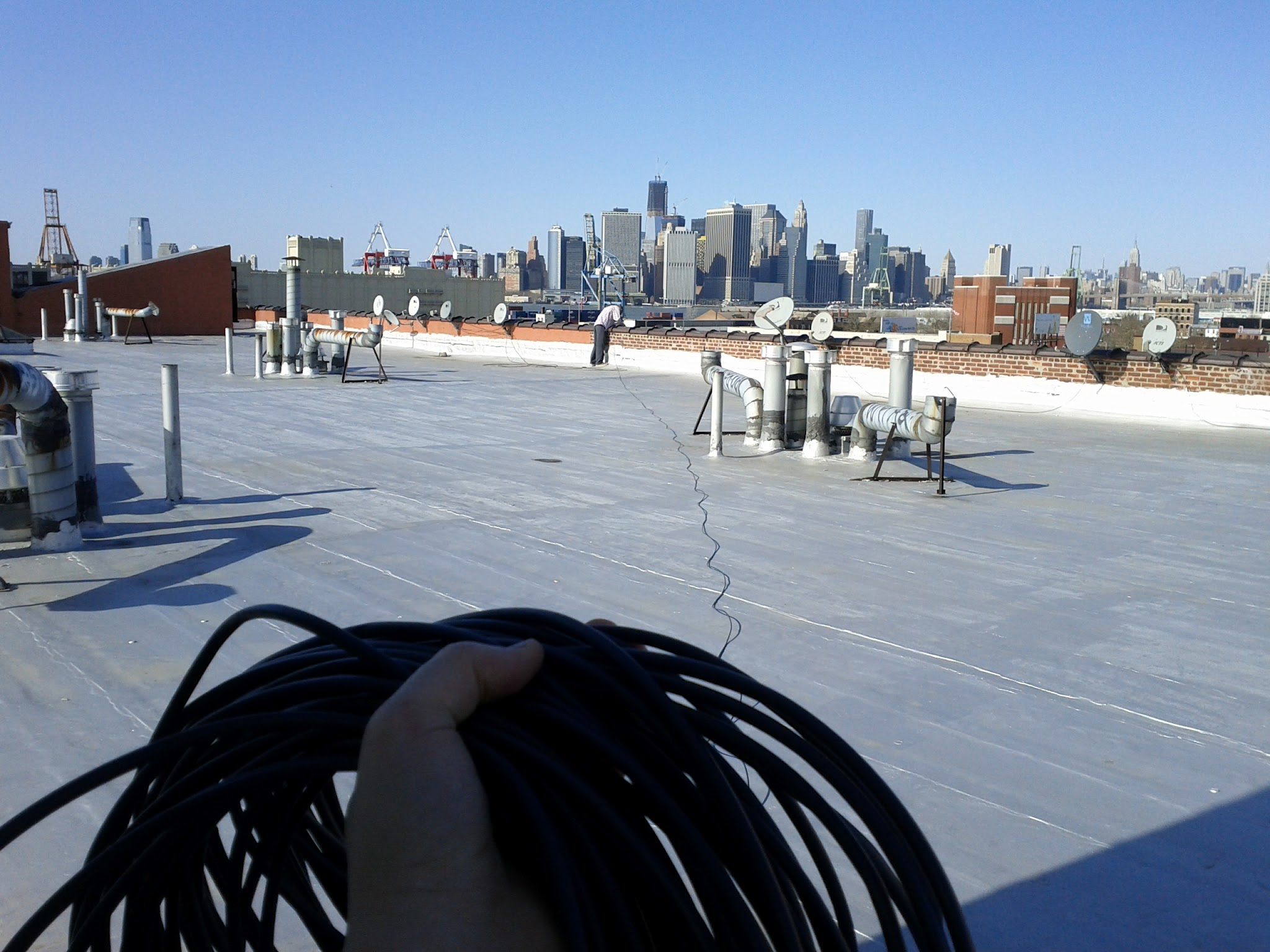
Running (PoE) Ethernet cable to install a mesh network node on the roof of apartment building north of Coffey Park

Beginning in Fall 2011, the Red Hook Initiative (RHI), a Brooklyn-based 501(c)(3) nonprofit organization, approached the Open Technology Institute about collaborating on a community wireless network. RHI wanted a way to communicate with the residents immediately around its community center.

When the network was initially launched, it had support for up to 150 simultaneous users and ran on an open-software platform called Commotion.

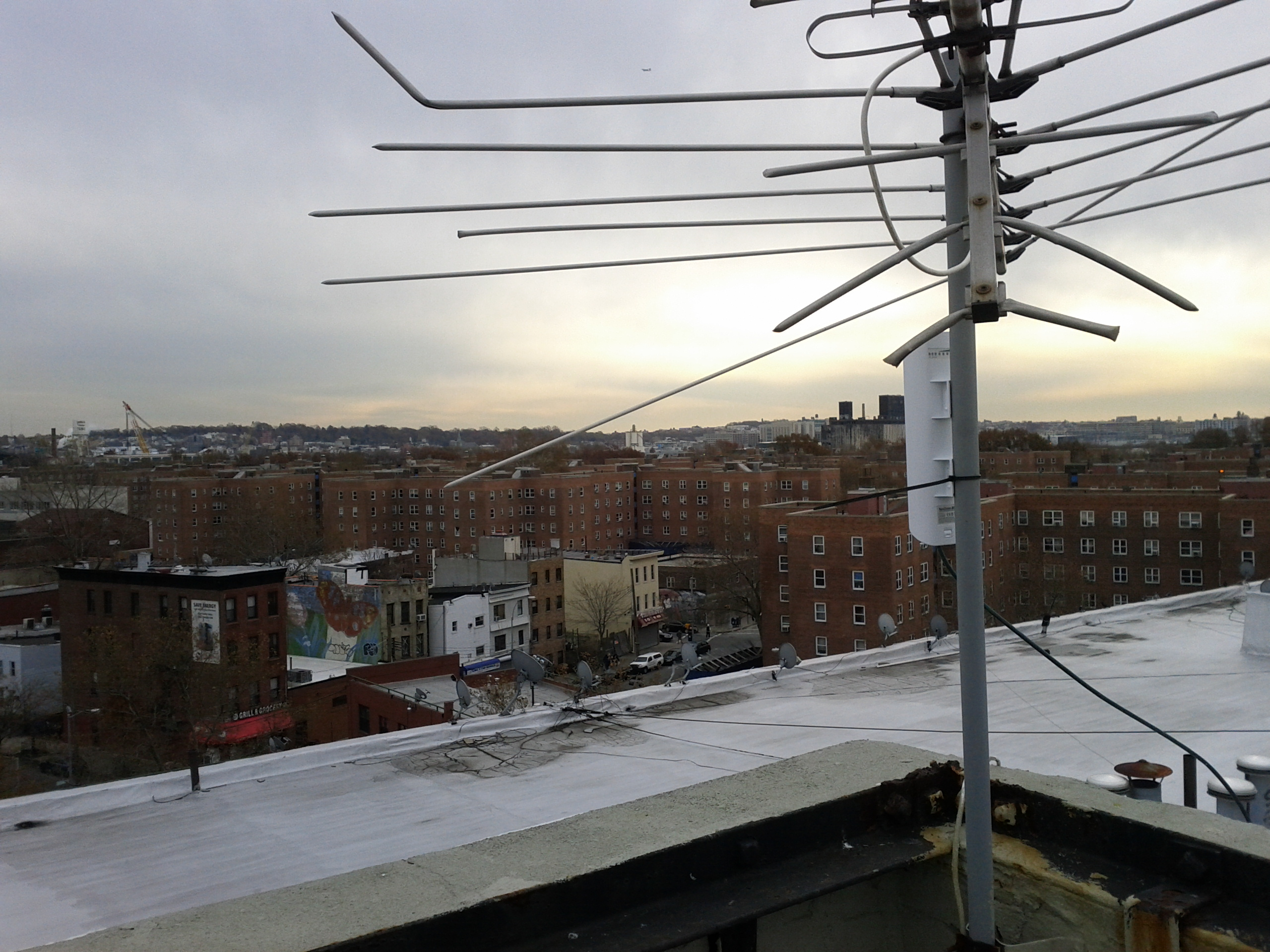
Repairing Red Hook WiFi mesh network node after Superstorm Sandy

== Hurricane Sandy ==
In 2012, after Hurricane Sandy struck the area, and many internet and communication systems were down throughout much of the city, Red Hook remained connected through its mesh network and the headquarters of the Red Hook Initiative became a hub for volunteer coordination, donation collections food distribution as residents came to the Red Hook Initiative's office to charge their devices and connect to the internet. Shortly afterwards, the Federal Emergency Management Agency (FEMA) connected Red Hook Wi-Fi to its satellite system, linking itself, the residents and the Red Cross into a communication matrix that could be used to find out about emergency relief, food banks as well as shelter locations. After the relief efforts had finished, a team led by the Red Hook Initiative continued to make improvements to the mesh network by installing nano stations powered by solar panels on rooftops around the Red Hook neighborhood.

Though the Red Hook Wi-Fi project was already in the works before Hurricane Sandy struck, it gained additional media attention after the storm.

In 2015, Red Hook Wi-Fi was selected to be part of the city's resiliency initiative from a group of 27 finalists competing in the Resiliency Innovations for a Stronger Economy.
