= Wireless community network =

Collaborative computer networks

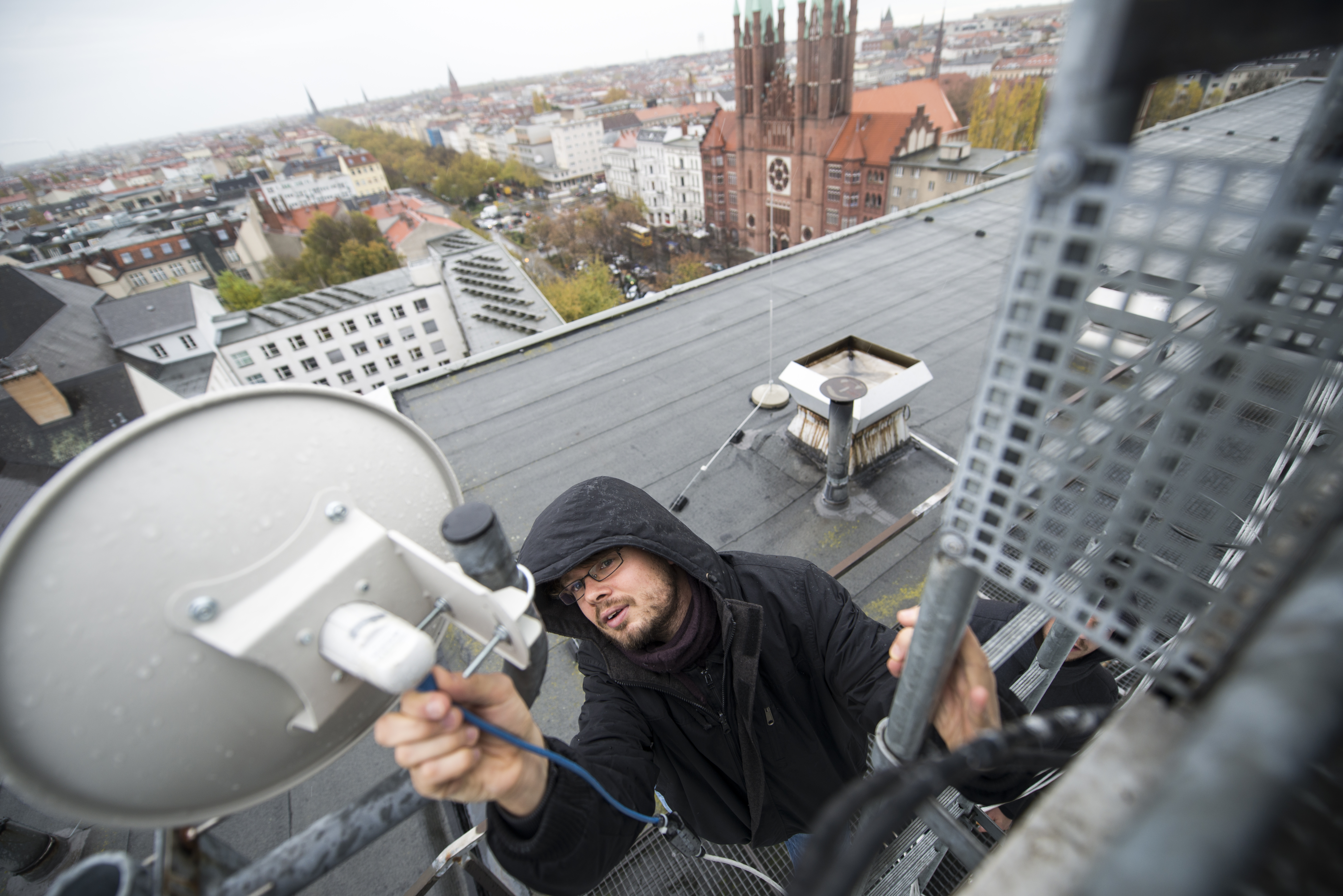
The Freifunk-Initiative installing Wi‑Fi antennas in Berlin-Kreuzberg in 2013.

Wireless community networks or wireless community projects or simply community networks, are decentralized, self-managed and collaborative computer networks organized in a grassroots fashion by communities, non-governmental organizations and cooperatives in order to provide a viable alternative to municipal wireless networks for consumers.

Many of these organizations set up wireless mesh networks which rely primarily on sharing of unmetered residential and business DSL and cable Internet. This sort of usage might be non-compliant with the terms of service of local internet service provider (ISPs) that deliver their service via the consumer phone and cable duopoly. Wireless community networks sometimes advocate complete freedom from censorship, and this position may be at odds with the acceptable use policies of some commercial services used. Some ISPs do allow sharing or reselling of bandwidth.

The First Latin American Summit of Community Networks, held in Argentina in 2018, presented the following definition for the term "community network": "Community networks are networks collectively owned and managed by the community for non-profit and community purposes. They are constituted by collectives, indigenous communities or non-profit civil society organizations that exercise their right to communicate, under the principles of democratic participation of their members, fairness, gender equality, diversity and plurality".

According to the Declaration on Community Connectivity, elaborated through a multistakeholder process organized by the Internet Governance Forum's Dynamic Coalition on Community Connectivity, community networks are recognised by a list of characteristics: Collective ownership; Social management; Open design; Open participation; Promotion of peering and transit; Promotion of the consideration of security and privacy concerns while designing and operating the network; and promotion of the development and circulation of local content in local languages.

== History ==
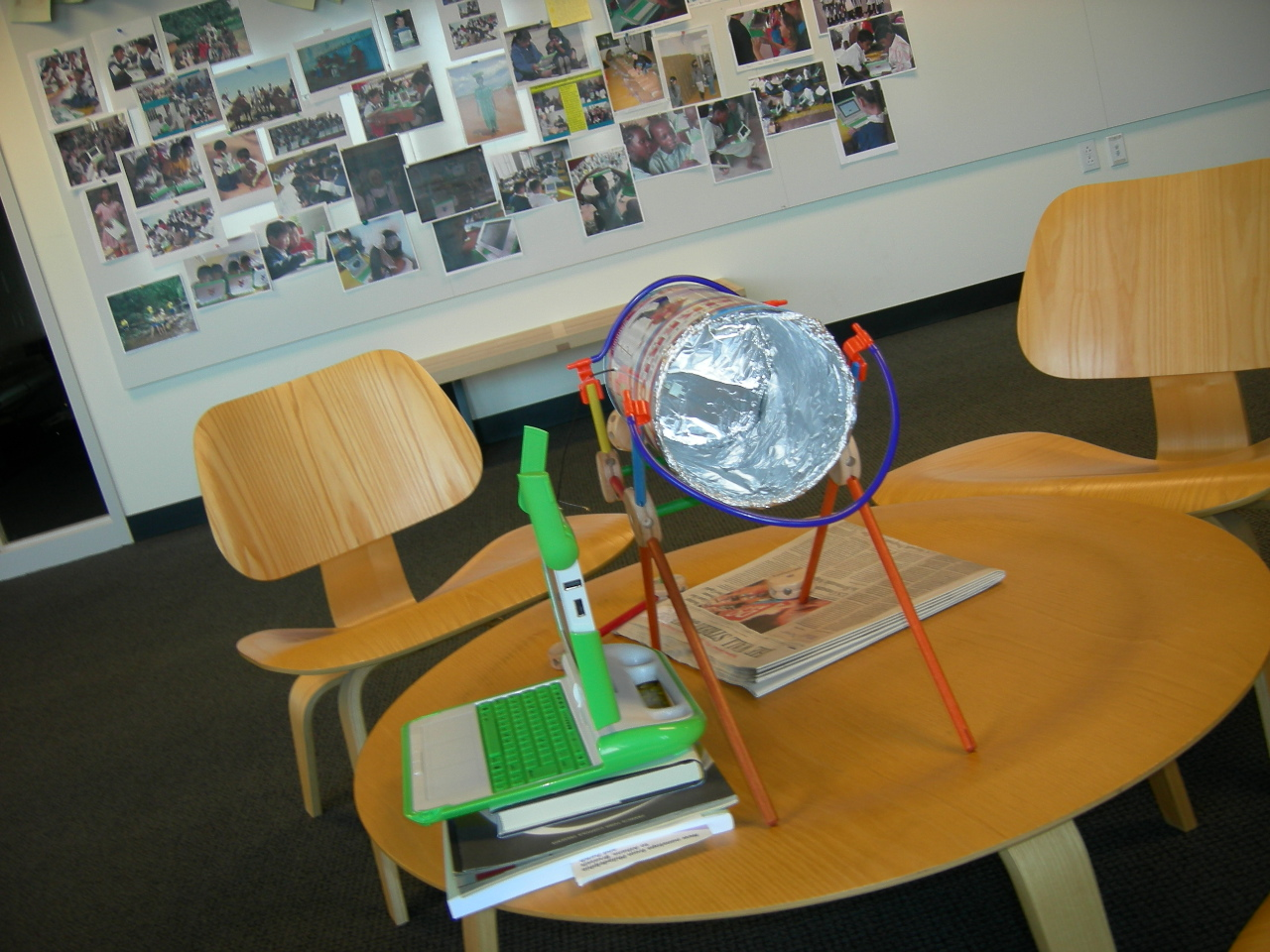
A cantenna connected to a One Laptop per Child machine.

Wireless community networks started as projects that evolved from amateur radio using packet radio, and from the free software community which substantially overlapped with the amateur radio community. Wireless neighborhood networks were established by technology enthusiasts in the early 2000s. The Redbricks Intranet Collective (RIC) started 1999 in Manchester, UK, to allow about 30 flats in the Bentley House Estate to share the subscription cost of one leased line from British Telecom (BT). Wi-Fi was quickly adopted by technology enthusiasts and hobbyists, because it was an open standard and consumer Wi-Fi hardware was comparatively cheap.

Wireless community networks started out by turning wireless access points designed for short-range use in homes into multi-kilometre long-range Wi-Fi by building high-gain directional antennas. Rather than buying commercially available units, some of the early groups advocated home-built antennas. Examples include the cantenna and RONJA, an optical link that can be made from a smoke flue and LEDs. The circuitry and instructions for such DIY networking antennas were released under the GNU Free Documentation License (GFDL). Municipal wireless networks, funded by local governments, started being deployed from 2003 onward.

Regarding the international policy scenario, discussions on Community Networks have gained prominence over the last few years, especially since the creation of the Internet Governance Forum's Dynamic Coalition on Community Connectivity in 2016, providing "a much needed platform through which various individuals and entities interested in the advancement of CNs have the possibility to associate, organise and develop, in a bottom-up participatory fashion collective 'principles, rules, decision-making procedures and shared programs that give shape to the evolution and use of the Internet.'".

=== Early community projects ===
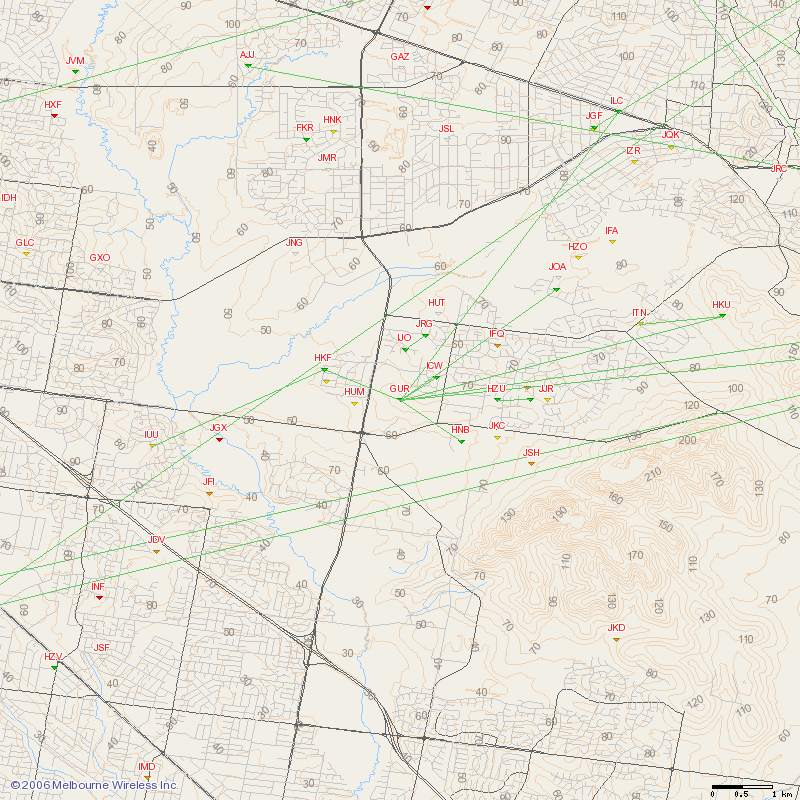
The Melbourne Wireless Network in Rowville.

By 2003, a number of wireless community projects had established themselves in urban areas across North America, Europe and Australia. In June 2000, Melbourne Wireless Inc. was established in Melbourne Australia as a not-for-profit project to establish a metropolitan area wireless network using off-the-shelf 802.11 wireless equipment. By 2003, it had 1,200 hotspots. In 2000 Seattle Wireless was founded with the stated aim of providing free WiFi access and share the cost of Internet connectivity in Seattle, USA. By April 2011, it had 80 free wireless access points all over Seattle and was steadily growing.

In August 2000, Consume was founded in London England as "collaborative strategy for the self provisioning of a broadband telecommunications infrastructure". Founded by Ben Laurie and others, Consume aimed to build a wireless infrastructure as alternative to the monopoly-held wired metropolitan area network. Besides providing Wi-Fi access in East London, Consume installed a large antenna on the roof of the former Greenwich Town Hall and documented the states of wireless connections in London. Consume created political pressure on municipal authorities, by staging public events, exhibitions, encouraging consumers to set up wireless equipment and setting up temporary Wi-Fi hotspots at events in East London. While Consume generated sustained media attention, it did not establish a lasting wireless community network.

The Wireless Leiden hobbyist project was established in September 2001 and constituted as non-profit foundation in 2003 with more than 300 active users. The Wireless Leiden foundation aimed to facilitate the cooperation of local government, businesses and residents to provide wireless networking in Leiden Netherlands. The first wireless community network in Spain was RedLibre, founded in September 2001 in Madrid. By 2002 RedLibre coordinated the efforts of 15 local wireless groups and maintained free RedLibre Wi-Fi hotspots in five cities. RedLibre has been credited for facilitating the widespread availability of WLAN in the urban areas of Spain.

In Italy, Ninux.org was founded by students and hackers in 2001 to create a grassroots wireless network in Rome, similar to Seattle Wireless. A turning point for Ninux was the lowering of prices in 2008 for consumer wireless equipment, such as antennas and routers. Ninux volunteers installed an increasing number of antennas on the roofs of Rome. The network served as example for other urban community wireless networks in Italy. By 2016, similar wireless networks had been installed in Florence, Bolongna, Pisa and Cosenza. While they share common technical and organizational frameworks, the working groups supporting these urban wireless community networks are driven by the different needs of the city in which they operate.

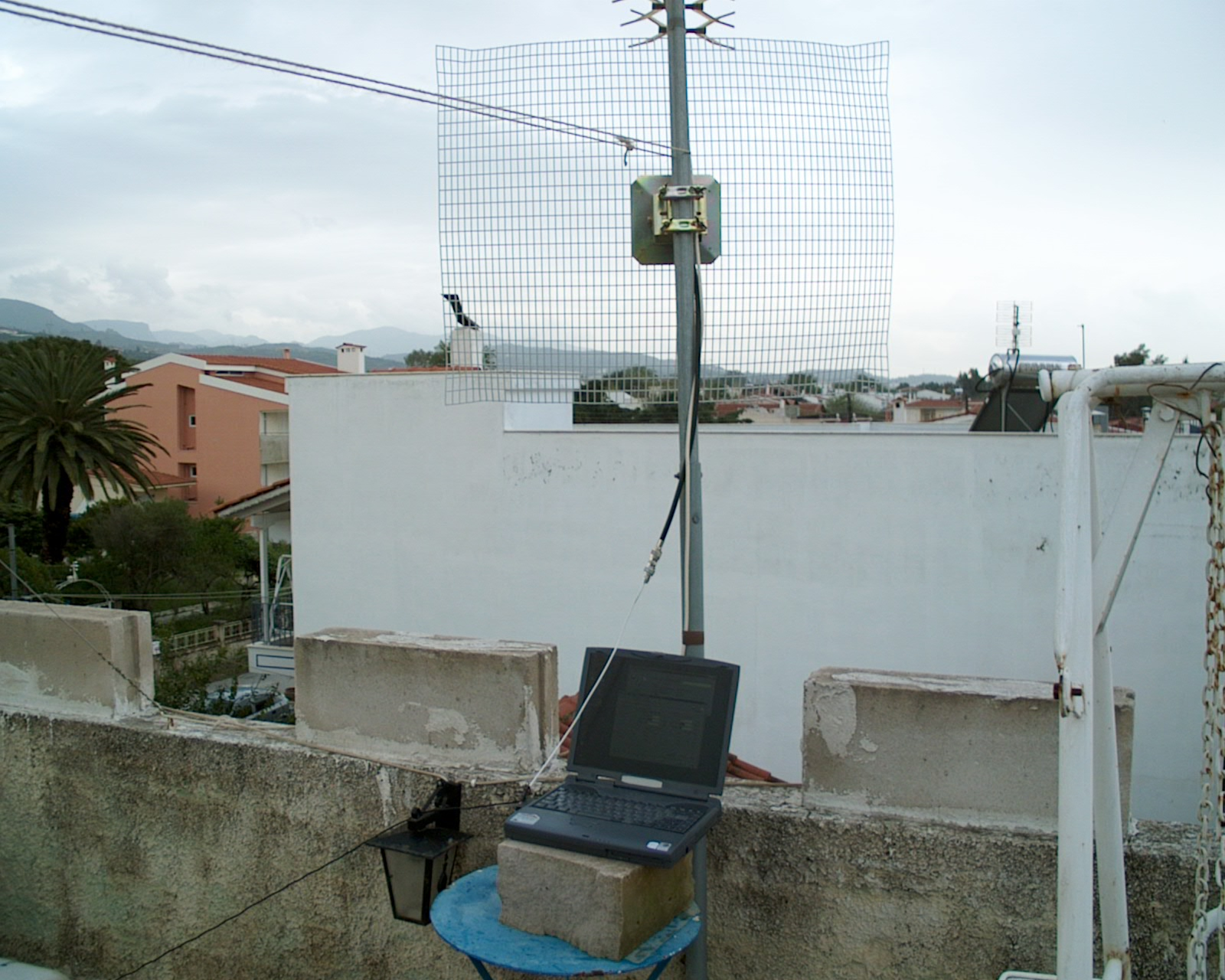
A Patras Wireless Network (PWN) access point, the first city-wide wireless community network in Greece.

Houston Wireless was founded in summer 2001 as the Houston Wireless Users Group. The telecommunications providers were slow to roll out third-generation wireless (3G), so Houston Wireless was established to promote high-speed wireless access across Houston and its suburbs. Houston Wireless experimented with network protocols such as IPsec, mobile IP and IPv6, as well as wireless technologies, including 802.11a, 802.11g and ultra-wideband (UWB). By 2003, it had 30 WLAN hotspots, 100 people on their mailing lists and their monthly meetings were attended by about 25 people.

NYCwireless was established in New York City in May 2001 to provide public hotspots and promote the use of consumer owned unlicensed low-cost wireless networking equipment. In order to get more public Wi-Fi hotspots installed, NYCwirelsss contracted with the for-profit company Cloud Networks, which was staffed by some of the founding members of the NYCwireless community project. In the aftermath of the September 11 attacks in 2001 NYCwirelsss helped to provide emergency communication by quickly assembling and deploying free Wi-Fi hotspots in areas of New York City that had no other telecommunications. In summer 2002, the Bryant Park wireless network became the flagship project of NYCwireless, with about 50 users every day. By 2003 NYCwireless had more than 100 active hotspots throughout New York City.

=== Early project in rural areas ===
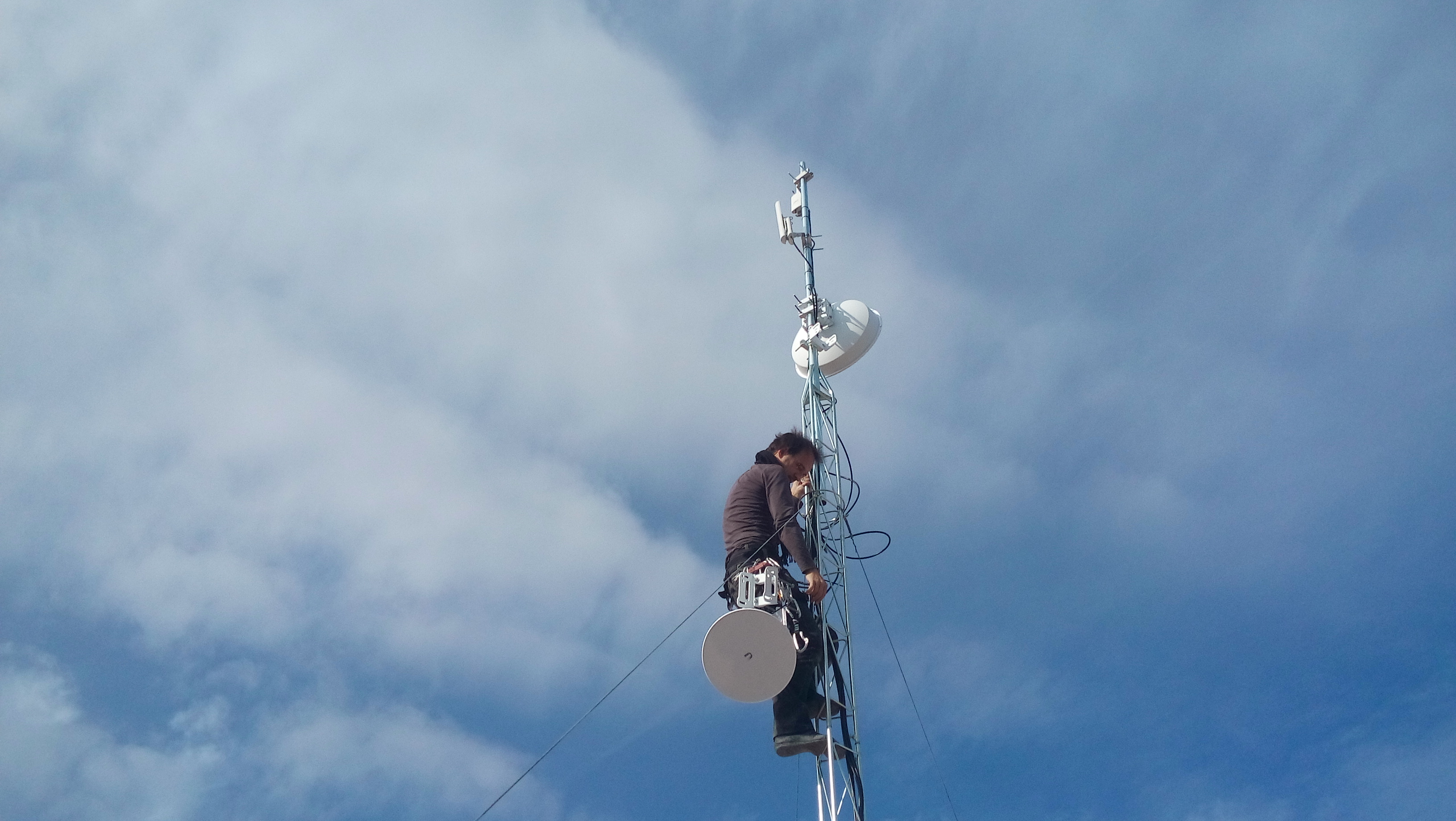
A volunteer installing a "supernode" of guifi.net. In July 2018 guifi.net had over 35,000 active nodes and about 63,000 km of wireless links.

In 2000, guifi.net was founded because commercial internet service providers did not build a broadband Internet infrastructure in rural Catalonia. Guifi.net was conceived as a wireless mesh network, where households can become a node in the network by operating a radio transmitter. Not every node needs to be a wireless router, but the network relies on some volunteers being connected to the Internet and sharing that access with others. In 2017 guifi.net had 23,000 nodes and was described as the biggest mesh network in the world.

In 2001, BCWireless founded to help communities in British Columbia, Canada, set up local Wi-Fi networks. BCWireless hobbyists experimented with IEEE 802.11b wireless networks and antennas to extend the range and power of signal, allow bandwidth sharing among local group members and establish wireless mesh networks. The Lac Seul First Nation communities set up their Wi-Fi network and constituted the non-profit K-Net to manage a wireless network based on IEEE 802.11g to provide the entire reserve with Wi-Fi using the unlicensed spectrum in combination with licensed spectrum at 3.5 GHz.

=== Co-operation between community networks ===
For the most, early wireless community projects had a local scope, but many still had a global awareness. In 2003, wireless community networks initiated the Pico Peering Agreement (PPA) and the Wireless Commons Manifesto. The two initiatives defined attempts to build an infrastructure, so that local wireless mesh networks could become extensive wireless ad hoc networks across local and national boundaries. In 2004, Freifunk released the OpenWrt-based firmware FFF for Wi-Fi devices that participate in a community network, which included a PPA, so that the owner of the node agrees to provide free transit across the network.

== Technical approach ==
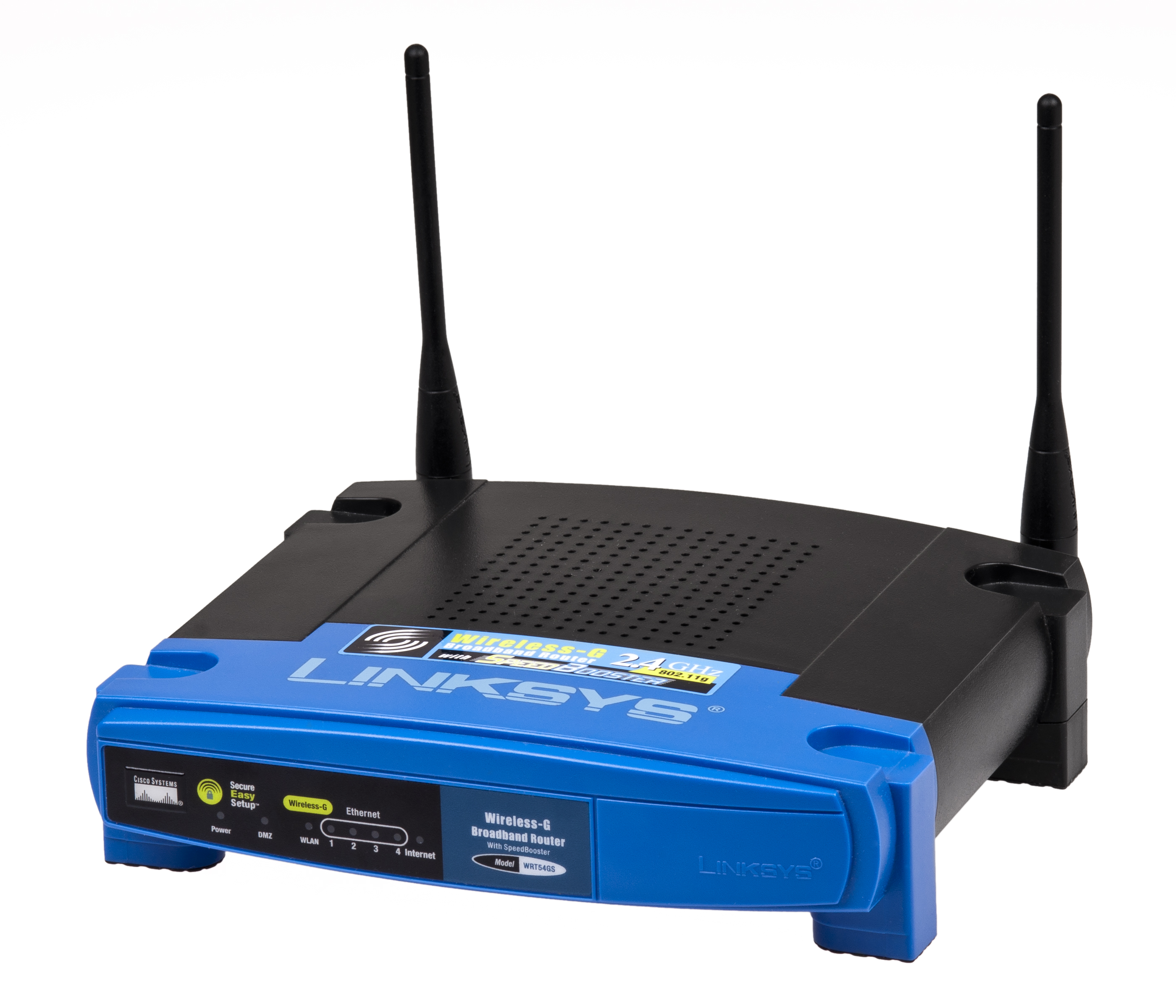
A Linksys WRT54GS

There are at least three technical approaches to building a wireless community network:

- Cluster: Advocacy groups which simply encourage sharing of unmetered internet bandwidth via Wi-Fi, may also index nodes, suggest uniform SSID (for low-quality roaming), supply equipment, DNS services, etc.
- Wireless mesh network: Technology groups which coordinate building a mesh network to provide Wi-Fi access to the internet
- Device-as-infrastructure: In 2013 the Open Technology Institute released the Commotion Wireless mesh network firmware, which allows Wi-Fi enabled mobile phones and computers to join a wireless community network by establishing a peer-to-peer network that still works when not connected to the wide area network.

=== Firmware ===
Wireless equipment, like many other consumer electronics, comes with hard-to-alter firmware that is preinstalled by the manufacturer. When the Linksys WRT54G series was launched in 2003 with an open source Linux kernel as firmware, it immediately became the subject of hacks and became the most popular hardware among community wireless volunteers. In 2005, Linksys released the WRT54GL version of its firmware, to make it even easier for customers to modify it. Community network hackers experimented with increasing the transmission power of the Linksys WRT54G or increasing the clock speed of the CPU to speed up data transmission.

The OpenWrt 18.06.1 login screen.

Hobbyists got another boost when in 2004 the OpenWrt firmware was released as open source alternative to proprietary firmware. The Linux-based embedded operating system could be used on embedded devices to route network traffic. Through successive versions, OpenWrt eventually could work on several hundred types of wireless devices and Wi-Fi routers. OpenWrt was named in honor of the WRT54G. The OpenWrt developers provided extensive documentation and the ability to include one's own code in the OpenWrt source code and compile the firmware.

In 2004, Freifunk released the FFF firmware for wireless community projects, which modified OpenWrt so that the node could be configured via a web interface and added features to better support a wireless ad hoc network with traffic shaping, statistics, Internet gateway support and an implementation of the Optimized Link State Routing Protocol (OLSR). A Wi-Fi access point that booting the FFF firmware joined the network by automatically announcing its Internet gateway capabilities to other nodes using OLSR HNA4. When a node disappeared, the other nodes registered the change in the network topology through the discontinuation of HNA4 announcements. At the time, Freifunk in Berlin had 500 Wi-Fi access points and about 2,200 Berlin residents used the network free of charge. The Freifunk FFF firmware is among the oldest approaches to establishing a wireless mesh network at significant scale. Other early attempts at developing an operating system for wireless devices that supported large scale wireless community projects were Open-Mesh and Netsukuku.

In 2006, Meraki Networks Inc was founded. The Meraki hardware and firmware had been developed as part of a PhD research project at the Massachusetts Institute of Technology to provide wireless access to graduate students. For years, the low-cost Meraki products fueled the growth of wireless mesh networks in 25 countries. Early Meraki-based wireless community networks included the Free-the-Net Meraki mesh in Vancouver, Canada. Constituted in 2006 as legal co-operative, members of the Vancouver Open Network Initiatives Cooperative paid five Canadian dollars per month to access the community wireless network provided by individuals who attached Meraki nodes to their home wireless connection, sharing bandwidth with any cooperative members nearby and participating in a meshed wireless network.

=== Community network software ===
By 2003, the Sidney Wireless community project had launched the NodeDB software, to facilitate the work of community networks by mapping the nodes participating in a wireless mesh network. Nodes needed to be registered in the database, but the software generated a list of adjacent nodes. When registering a node that participated in a community network, the maintainer of the node could leave a note on the hardware, antenna reach and firmware in operation and so find other network community members who were willing to participate in a mesh.

== Organization ==
Organizationally, a wireless community network requires either a set of affordable commercial technical solutions or a critical mass of hobbyists willing to tinker to maintain operations. Mesh networks require that a high level of community participation and commitment be maintained for the network to be viable. The mesh approach currently requires uniform equipment. One market-driven aspect of the mesh approach is that users who receive a weak mesh signal can often convert it to a strong signal by obtaining and operating a repeater node, thus extending the network.

Such volunteer organizations focusing on technology that is rapidly advancing sometimes have schisms and mergers. The Wi-Fi service provided by such groups is usually free and without the stigma of piggybacking. An alternative to the voluntary model is to use a co-operative structure.

=== Business models ===
Wireless community projects made volunteer bandwidth-sharing technically feasible and have been credited with contributing to the emergence of alternative business models in the consumer Wi-Fi market. The commercial Wi-Fi provider Fon was established in 2006 in Spain. Fon customers were equipped with a Linksys Wi-Fi access point that runs a modified OpenWrt firmware so that Fon customers shared Wi-Fi access among each other. Public Wi-Fi provisioning through FON customers was broadened when FON entered a 50% revenue-sharing agreement with customers who made their entire unused bandwidth available for resale. In 2009, this business model gained broader acceptance when British Telecom allowed its own home customers to sell unused bandwidth to BT and FON roamers.

Wireless community projects for the most provide best-effort Wi-Fi coverage. However, since the mid-2000s local authorities started to contract with wireless community networks to provide municipal wireless networks or stable Wi-Fi access in a defined urban area, such as a park. Wireless community networks started to participate in a variety of public-private partnerships. The non-profit community network ZAP Sherbrooke has partnered with public and private entities to provide Wi-Fi access and received financial support from the University of Sherbrooke and Bishop's University to extend the coverage of its wireless mesh throughout the city of Sherbrooke, Canada.

== Regulation ==
Certain countries regulate the selling of internet access, requiring a license to sell internet access over a wireless network. In South Africa it is regulated by the Independent Communications Authority of South Africa (ICASA). They require that WISP's apply for a VANS or ECNS/ECS license before being allowed to resell internet access over a wireless link. The Internet Society's publication "Community Networks in Latin America: Challenges, Regulations and Solutions" brings a summary of regulations regarding Community Networks among Latin American countries, the United States and Canada.

== See also ==
- AWMN
- Community Broadband Network
- Computer network
- DD-WRT
- List of wireless community networks by region
- Multiple-input multiple-output communications (MIMO)
- Neighborhood Internet service provider
- nodewatcher, an open-source node database project
- OpenWireless.org, a project by the Electronic Frontier Foundation (EFF)
- Roofnet
- South African wireless community networks
- Wireless LAN Security
