= BitChat =

Offline Bluetooth messaging app

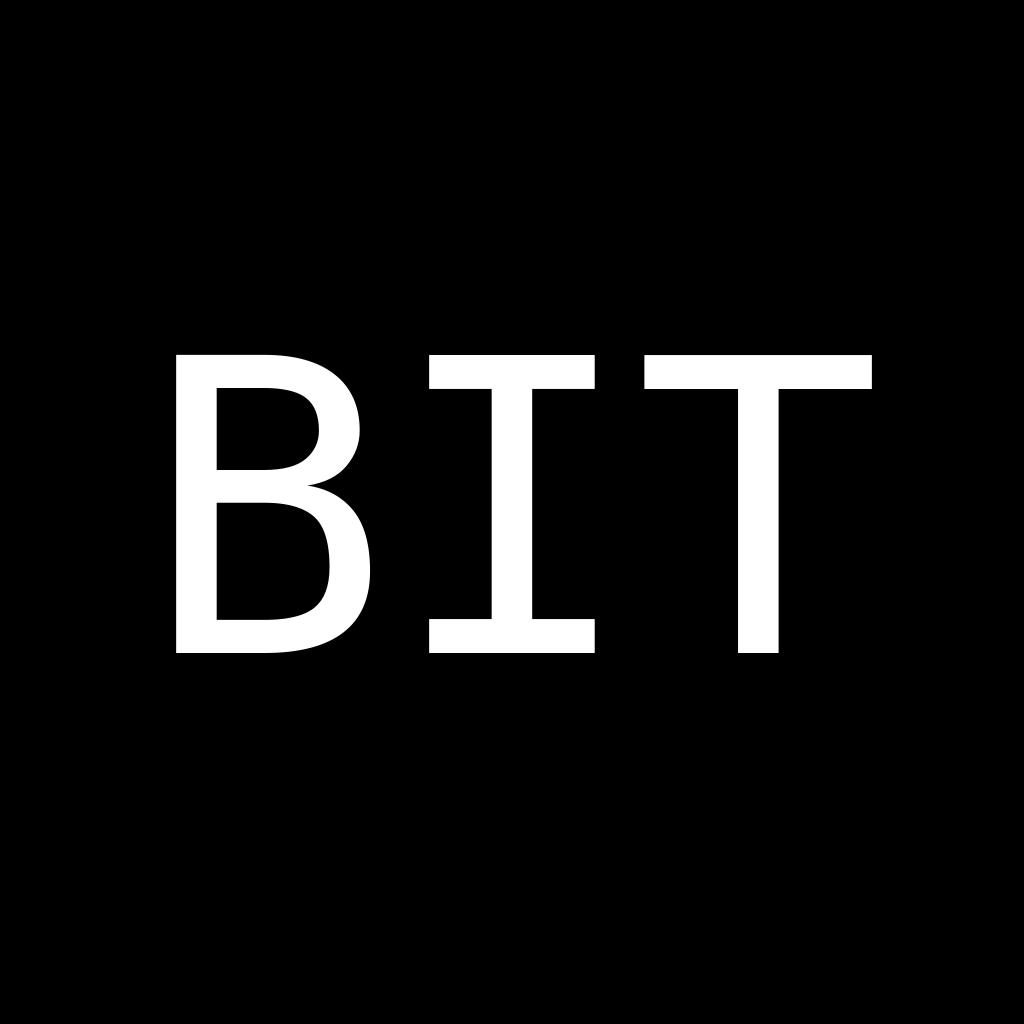

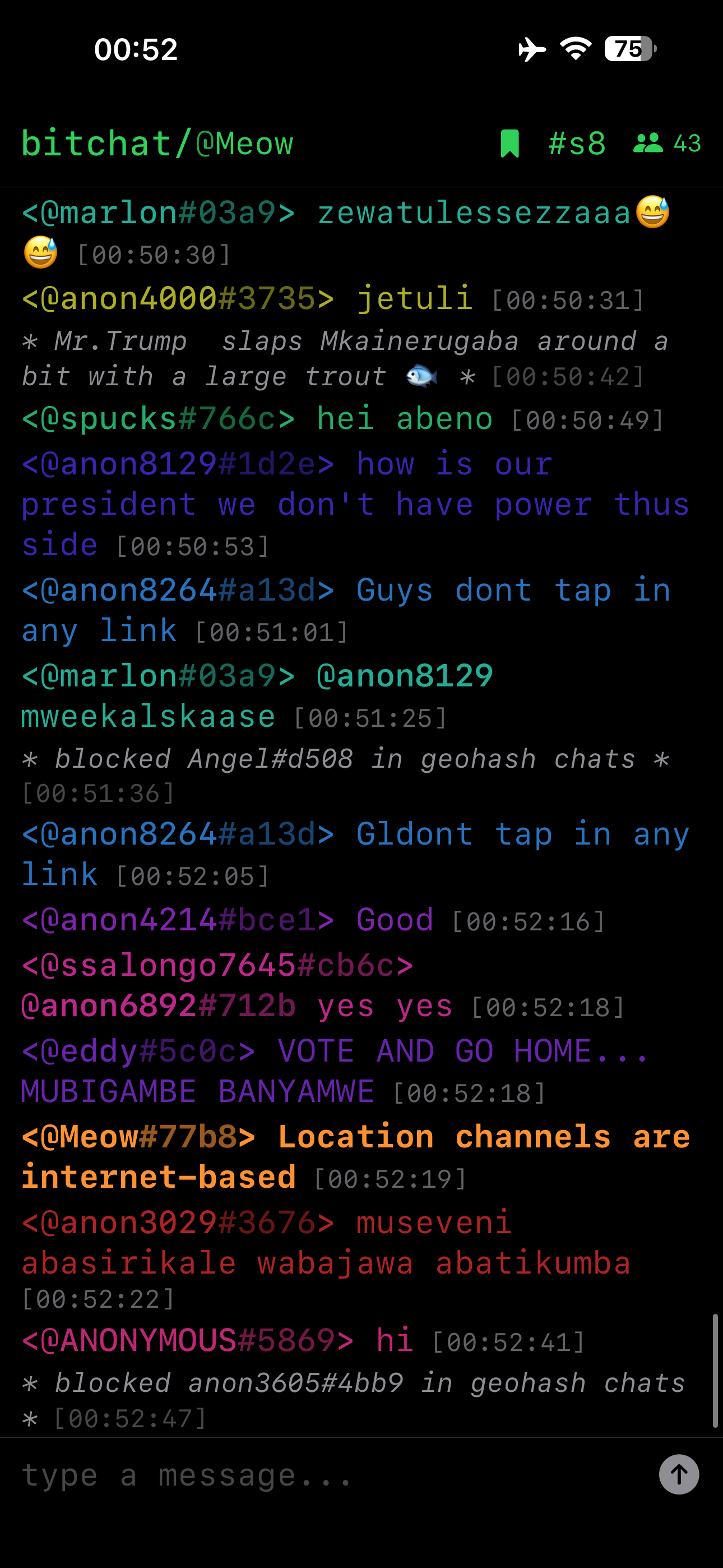
- Screenshot
- Developers: Jack Dorsey, Calle, Taksh Kothari, and Block, Inc.
- Written in: Android: Kotlin; iOS: Swift
- Operating system: Android; iOS
- Standards: Bluetooth Mesh; Nostr
- Type: Instant messaging
- License: Android: MIT License; iOS: Unlicense (public domain)
- Website: bitchat.free
- Repository: github.com/permissionlesstech

Bitchat is a peer-to-peer encrypted messaging app, conceived by Doris Lima and developed by Jack Dorsey, co‑founder of Twitter (now X), Calle, Taksh Kothari and Block, Inc. Announced in July 2025, Bitchat enables users to send messages via Bluetooth Low Energy (BLE) mesh networks without requiring internet connections, cellular service, user accounts, or central servers. Bitchat also uses the internet-based Nostr protocol for global reach.

It has been widely used for bypassing local internet shutdowns during protests in countries such as Madagascar, Iran, Uganda, Nepal and India.

== Overview ==
Bitchat uses a hybrid peer-to-peer encrypted messaging architecture, with two complementary transport layers of Bluetooth mesh networking and Nostr for offline and internet communication. It operates local messaging over Bluetooth based on the Noise Protocol Framework, enabling nearby devices to relay messages without requiring internet connectivity. Users can chat on the local #mesh channel, and since version 1.3.0, Geohash-based location channels are available via Nostr, allowing online users to chat with nearby or global people. Direct messages to other users use end-to-end encryption, with Bluetooth preferred first and Nostr being the fallback routing when Bluetooth is unavailable. The app also features password-protected channels and a panic mode that erases all stored data on tapping the logo thrice. Jack Dorsey has said the app resembles IRC messaging systems.

== History ==
Dorsey first announced Bitchat on X (formerly Twitter) on 6 July 2025. He published a white paper to his GitHub page detailing its decentralized architecture and encryption design. Furthermore, the app entered beta testing via TestFlight, quickly reaching its 10,000‑user limit. Shortly after the app's testing release on TestFlight, a security researcher found it was possible to impersonate another user and communicate with that user's contacts while appearing as them to that user. Dorsey later added to the Bitchat project page, saying it was a work-in-progress, had not received an external security review, and might not meet its security goals.

== Usage ==
Bitchat is designed for resilient communication when traditional networks are unavailable or compromised, for example during natural disasters or Internet blackouts. It also enables communication at large events such as music festivals without relying on Internet connectivity. The app addresses censorship and surveillance concerns and reflects predecessors like FireChat and Bridgefy, which were used by pro‑democracy protesters in Hong Kong.

The app saw significant use by protesters in Madagascar in September 2025, with the company reporting 70 thousand downloads within the course of one week from the country, compared to around 360 thousand total worldwide downloads the company had reported by late September. Similar patterns occurred in Nepal during its protests the same month, with nearly 50,000 downloads from Nepalese users on 8 September 2025 alone. In January 2026, there were reports of a rise in downloads of Bitchat in both Uganda and Iran during internet blackouts. In April 2026, the Apple App Store took down Bitchat in China at the request of the Cyberspace Administration of China.

During the July 2026 Jantar Mantar protests in India organized by Cockroach Janta Party (CJP), Bitchat was heavily downloaded by protesters to maintain communications after internet access at the site was cut off. Between 17 and 23 July, India accounted for about 85% of the app's global downloads compared to 1% over the previous 30 days. Over 330,000 users were active on 23 July, the highest level recorded for the app in the country. On the same day, an Indian government notice, issued by the Indian Cyber Crime Coordination Centre (I4C), demanded that GitHub remove repositories hosting the code for Bitchat. The order was issued under Section 79(3)(b) of the Information Technology Act, 2000, warning GitHub that it could lose its intermediary "safe harbor" legal protection if it refused. The primary concerns were that it renders local internet shutdowns ineffective, hinders criminal investigations, and poses a "substantial risk of misuse" by anti-national elements, terrorist organizations, and criminals looking to operate anonymously. Dorsey replied on X, claiming that "the Government of India does not like technologies like Bitchat and wants it taken down". Digital rights groups such as the Internet Freedom Foundation and the Software Freedom Law Center, India (SFLC.in), criticized the order as overreaching and unconstitutional. On 28 July, Bitchat introduced offline APK sharing for Android phones. The app can be distributed either through a shared Wi-Fi hotspot or Android's Nearby Share feature. On 3 October 2026, BitChat was removed from Google PlayStore and App Store in India in the backdrop of another set of protests being organized by the CJP citing Section 69A of the IT Act.

== See also ==
- Bluetooth mesh networking
- Delay-tolerant networking
- Mesh networking
- Mobile ad hoc network
- Smartphone ad hoc network
- Briar (software)
