= Tactics and methods surrounding the 2019–2020 Hong Kong protests =

The sophistication, novelty and diversity of tactics and methods used by protests in the 2019–2020 Hong Kong protests have been noted by many scholars and news outlets around the world. They range from new principles of autonomy and decentralisation, incorporating different methods of demonstration, economic and social protest, and most notably new technological methods for organising and ensuring the security of protesters. Many of these tactics have been used or were inspired by previous protests. The sheer scale, complexity, and variety of tactics used have become a case study for mass protests around the world.

== Major principles ==
=== Decentralised leadership ===
Unlike the 2014 Hong Kong protests, the democracy movement of 2019 has taken place in a generally decentralised manner, and has been described as "impeccably organized" by the Los Angeles Times. The Civil Human Rights Front (CHRF) has a long history of organising social movements and was the organiser of the two massive protests on 9 and 16 June. Demosistō, led by Joshua Wong, who was in jail at the beginning of the movement, and the localist groups, called on supporters to participate in protests. However, unlike the 2014 Hong Kong protests, none of these groups have claimed leadership over this movement. Many pro-democracy legislators were seen at the protests but mainly took supporting roles only. This kind of decentralisation has led to increased fluidity for protesters and difficulty for officials to locate representatives for negotiations or prosecution.

On 1 July, after protesters forced their way into the Legislative Council, Wong said the act was intended "to show how the Legislative Council has never represented the voice of the people." He also said there would not have been any rallies or protests had the Legislative Council been democratically elected. However, some protesters believed that the decentralised leadership prompted protests to escalate without proper planning, evident in the storming of the LegCo building.

Chinese University of Hong Kong professor Francis Lee called this new type of decentralised, leaderless movement, the "open-source" protest model. Through a participatory process of digital democracy activists are able to collaborate by voting on tactics and brainstorming next moves in an egalitarian manner in which everybody has an equal say. Telegram chat groups and online forums with voting mechanisms to make collective decisions have facilitated this type of flexible co-ordination.

=== Flexible tactics ===
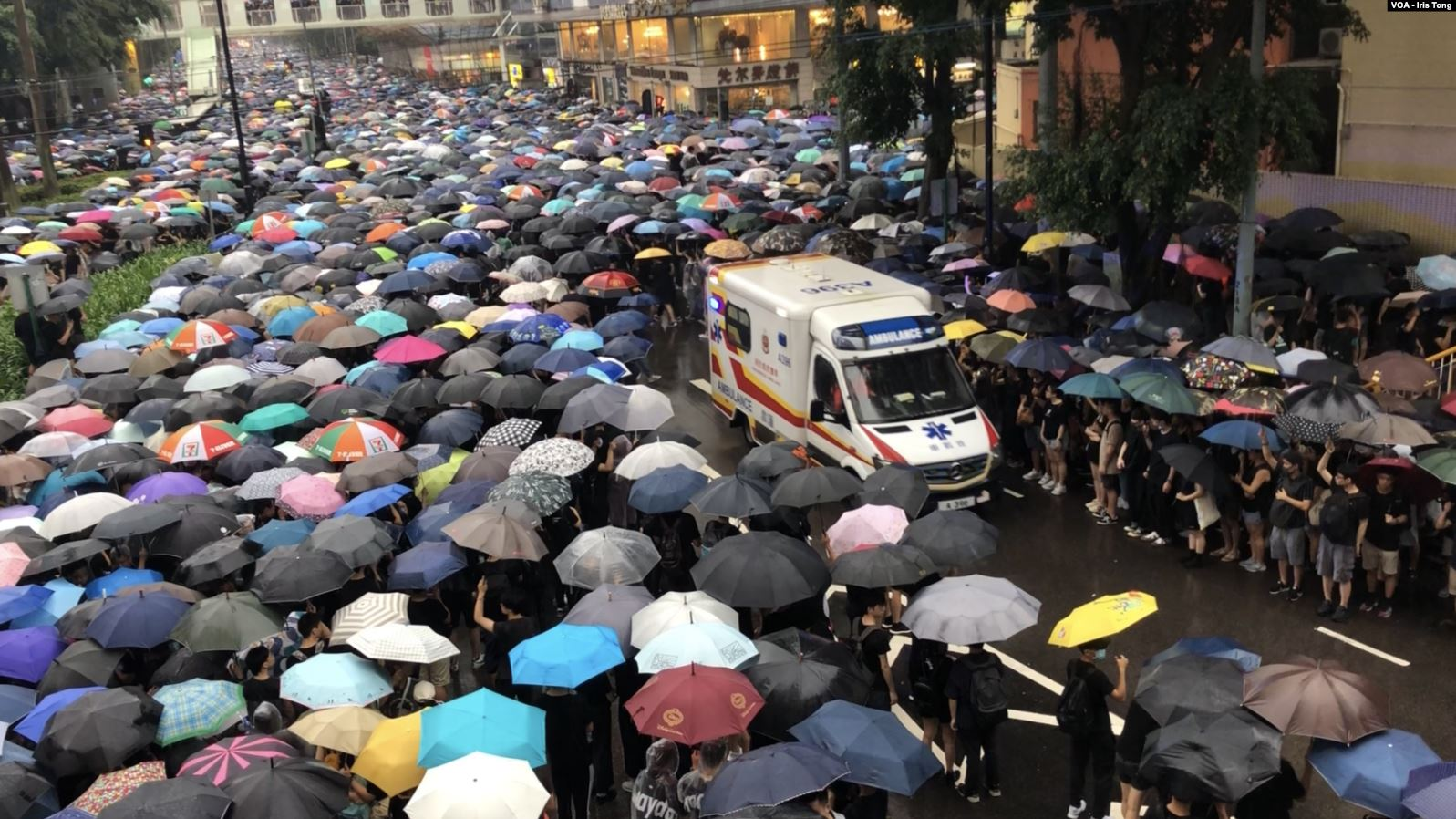
Protesters make way for an ambulance

Protesters are reported to have adopted Bruce Lee’s philosophy to be "formless [and] shapeless, like water", shortened to a common motto among protesters, "be water". By moving in a mobile and agile fashion to different government offices during the 21 June protests, they aimed to bring additional pressure to bear on the government. Starting from August, protesters embraced a hit-and-run tactic (or flexible, "be water" approach to converging at assembly points and dispersing again) when the police began to ban requests for demonstrations. As the police begin to advance, protesters will retreat, though they will often show up again later in the same district or reemerge in other places in a short period of time. The metaphor has been expanded to include "Be strong like ice" when they were confronting the police force, "gather like dew" when protesters organised "flashmob" protests that were often extemporaneous, and "scatter like mist" to ensure that protesters can escape before police clearance to avoid arrest.

Another tactic is geographical dispersal. While the 2014 Hong Kong protests were centered on three locations, in the 2019 movement, demonstrations and clashes with Hong Kong Police diversified to over 20 different neighbourhoods spread throughout Hong Kong Island, Kowloon, and the New Territories. Starting from October, the flash mob strategy became more common as a result of the politicisation of the MTR metro system. Small flash mobs of protesters will show up in areas near their home and "blossom everywhere" (Chinese: 遍地開花) to avoid arrest.

Maintaining anonymity was important as protesters face up to 10-year jail sentences if they were convicted. They may also face the risks of being doxxed and harassed by Chinese netizens. To maintain their anonymity, protesters began adopting pseudonyms, locking their social media accounts, and using codes to describe their actions. According to The Verge, protesters and their supporters have to "face a future of unknown retaliation" from authorities and that "the risks range from personal and family safety to job insecurity to fear of future arrest".

Throughout the protests, efforts were made to convert the protests into a long-term political movement. Acts of dissent were incorporated into Hong Kong citizens' daily life. This allowed the momentum of the protests to carry on even if the police continued their crackdown on the protests. By diversifying protest tactics, protesters and activists were able to express their discontent towards the government and continue to contribute to the protest movement through tactics other than participating in mass marches and direct confrontations. Alternate forms of protest, such as the yellow economic circle, had a low threshold of entry and were "conscience-driven" initiatives. Political analyst Kenneth Chan believed that ultimately, these daily life protests would "[breed] a sense of self-determination and solidarity against the government" for Hong Kong people.

=== Unity and cohesion ===
The "Do Not Split" (Chinese: 不割蓆) principle has helped maintain cohesion throughout the broad political spectrum of the struggle. Embracing a diversity of tactics has allowed participants to engage in different levels of action while respecting the roles that others play. This is in direct contrast to the 2014 protests, where multiple protest groups ended up criticising each other. Hong Kong political commentator Lewis Lau said, "'Do Not Split' serves as a bridge ... by promoting mutual respect for diverging views within the protest movement." Minimisation of internal conflict is key to achieving broader goals; a common phrase that has served as a reminder is "Preserve yourself and the collective; no division." Through unity, it would be more difficult for the authorities to instigate the differences between different camps in an attempt to break the protest movement apart. Solidarity between protesters and engagement with the "Do Not Split" praxis was evidenced by the two mothers' sit-in demonstrations of 14 June and 5 July and the silver-haired protest on 17 July. Tens of thousands attended the rallies, in support of the protest actions of the younger generation, while standing firm together in opposition to police brutality, Carrie Lam, and the intervention of the mainland Chinese government. Austin Ramzy from The New York Times added that the two groups shared a symbiotic relationship. While the 12 June unrest showed the limitations of peaceful marches and the value of aggression, the continuation of large-scale marches showed to the world how widespread public dissatisfaction towards the government was. According to Benny Tai, there would be support for more radical actions if peaceful marches were not successful in forcing the government to concede.

Several media organisations have described the two most influential camps among protesters: the "brave fighters" on the frontlines, and the majority "non-violent peaceful" camp that has engaged in mass demonstrations, civil disobedience, and numerous creative actions. A study about the on-going protests by researchers from several Hong Kong universities found that "most of the participants agreed that 'the maximum impact could only be achieved when peaceful assembly and confrontational actions work together.'" Many "peaceful, rational and non-violent" protesters also expressed that they will not split with the "brave fighters" despite not agreeing with their tactics. Some of them also provided assistance to them by donating supplies and leaving money for radical protesters to take public transport or by voluntarily driving them home, especially in later days when public transport was often closed before and during protests. Some also distributed free McDonald's gift certificates to the radical protesters to support their daily living, as most protesters refused to accept actual donations. Pop-up stores selling protective gadgets for the protesters and undercover clinics have also been set up to aid the protesters. Some protest sympathizers, including doctors and nurses, also volunteered to become on-field first-aiders. Some elderly people in Hong Kong who supported the movement also formed a group named Protect the Children. These volunteers would attempt to separate the police and the young protesters in the frontline in an attempt to mediate their conflicts and provide assistance.

== Demonstrations ==
=== Black bloc and group defences ===
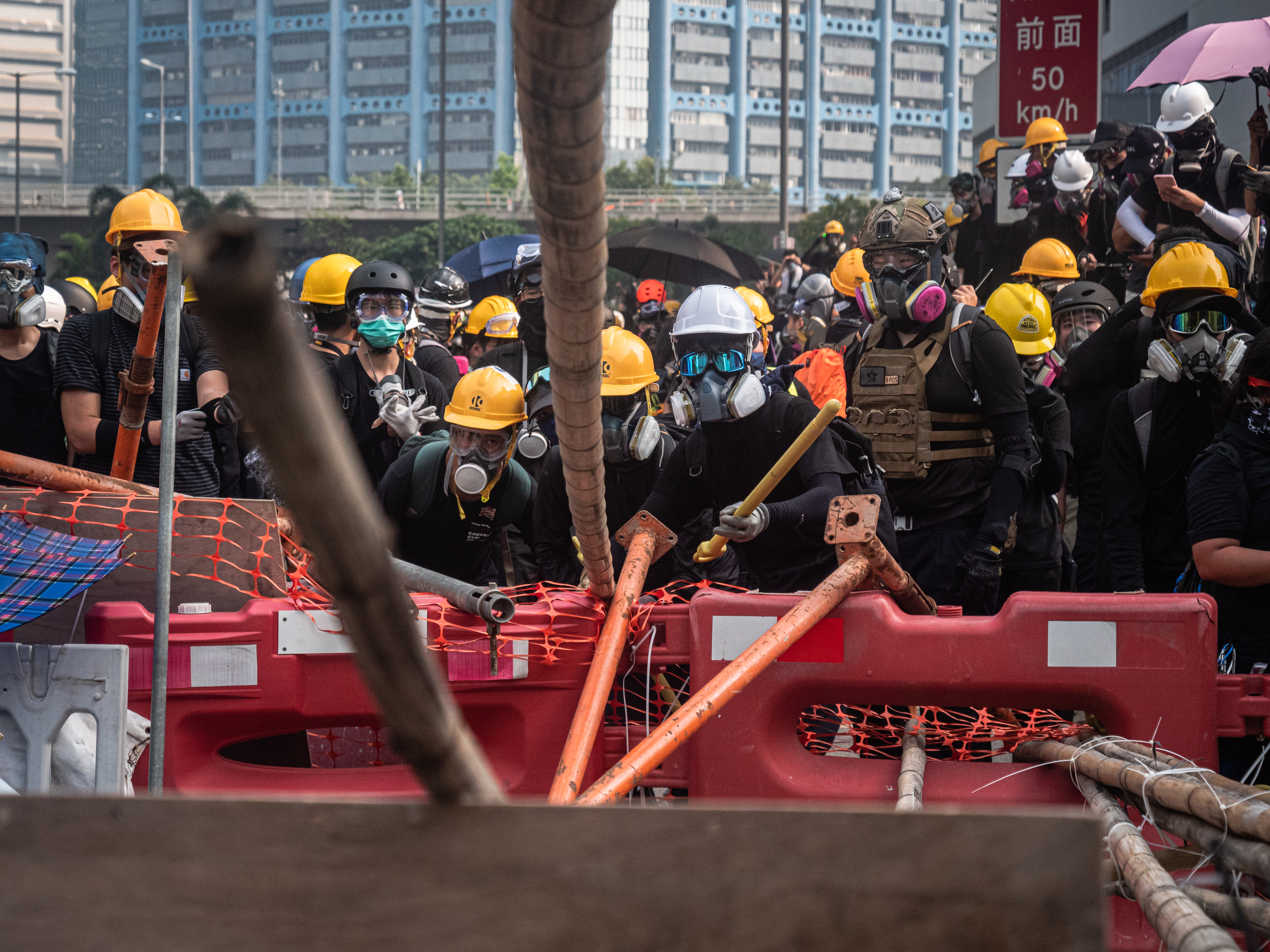
Black bloc protesters, 2019

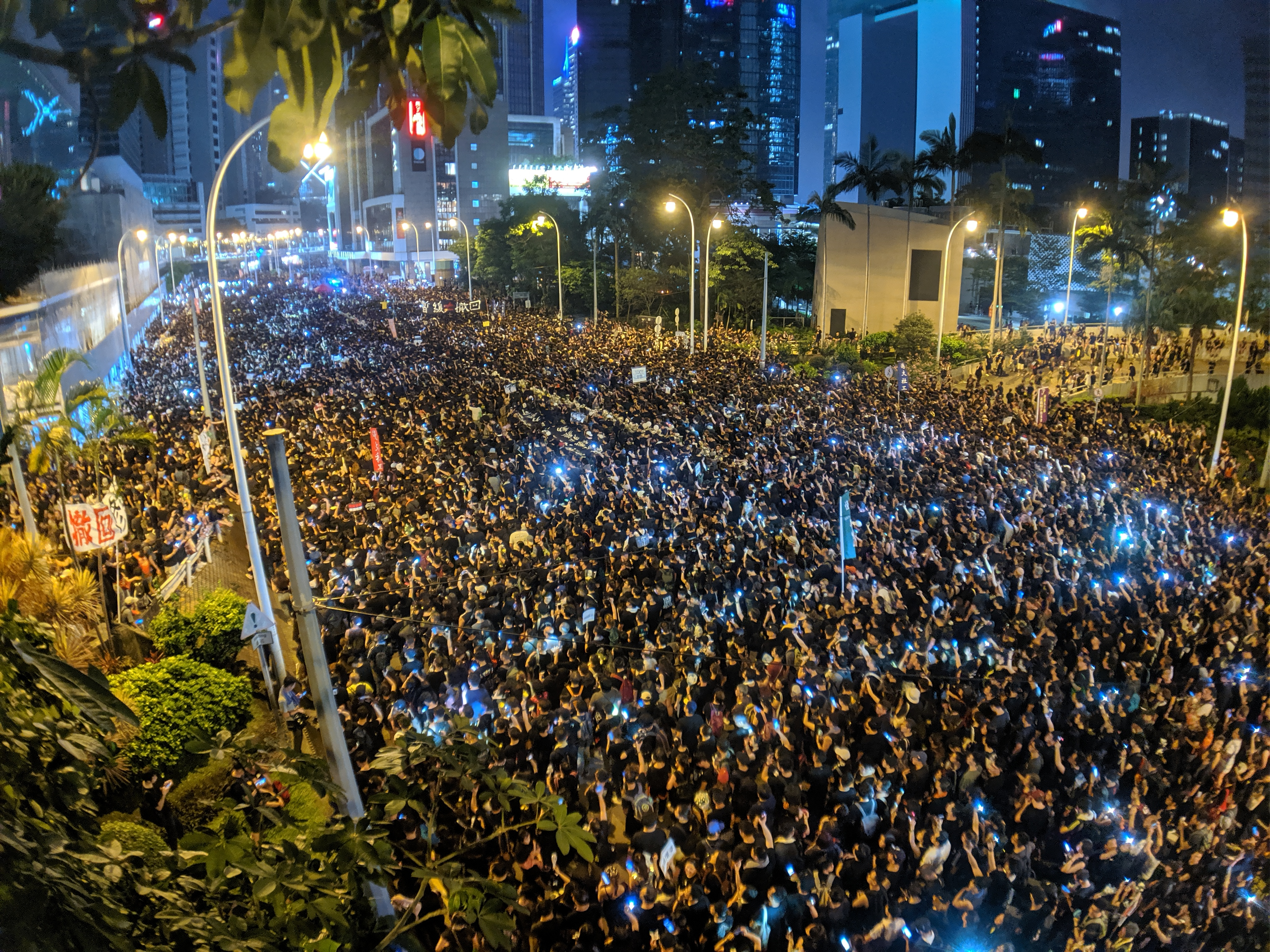
Protesters commonly wore black during the protests.

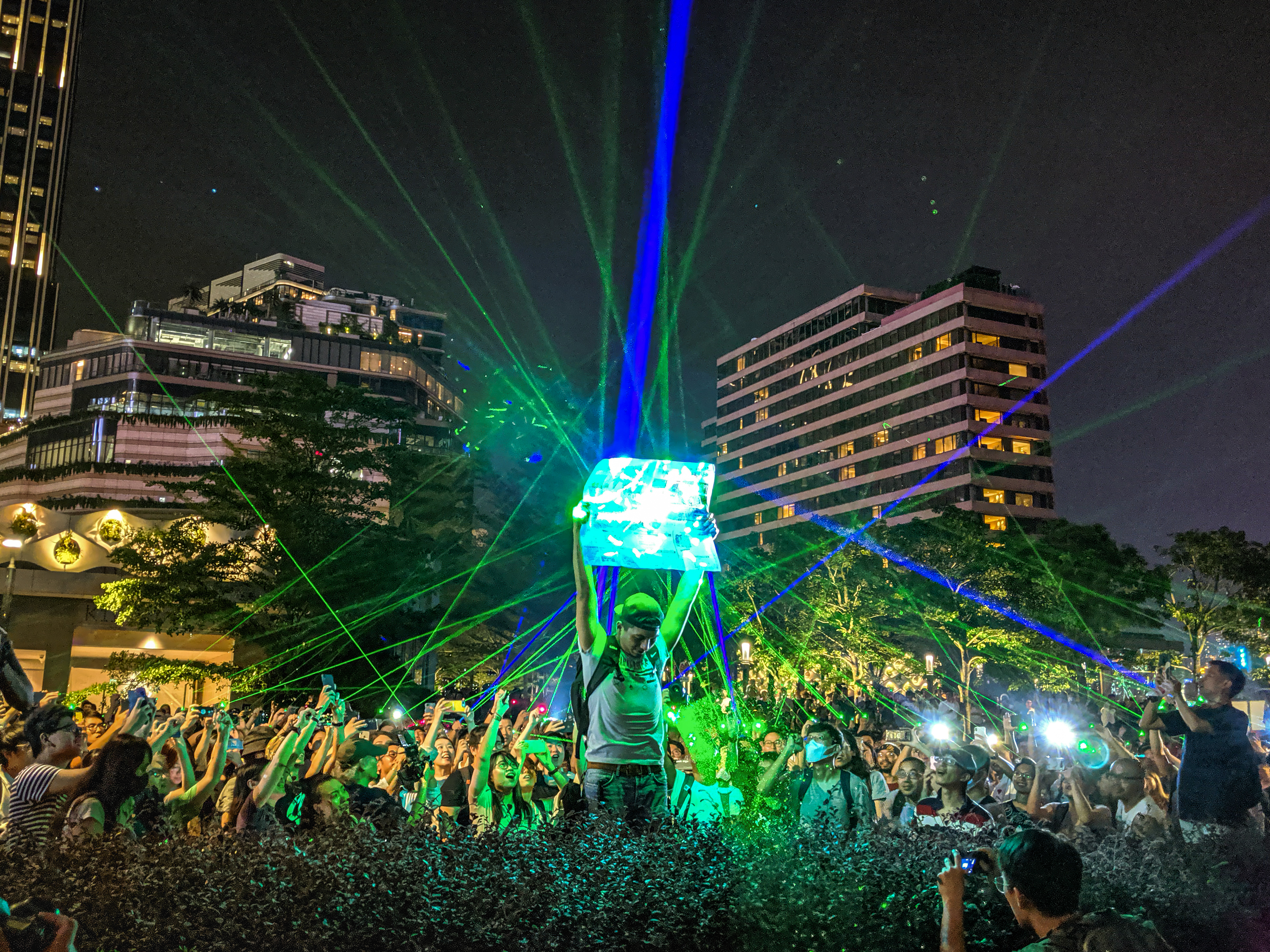
Protesters with laser pointers

During street protests, black bloc methods enhanced anonymity and privacy, enabling demonstrators to "be water" and function more effectively as a group. Participants in demonstrations dressed in black, and wore personal protective equipment such as hard hats and gloves. To resist police surveillance and protect against chemical weapons such as tear gas and pepper spray, face masks and goggles were popular attire. Protesters also developed a set of hand signs to aid communications and form human chains to transport supplies. As protests continued to escalate and the police began to use higher levels of riot control weaponry, activists upgraded their makeshift gear including using surfboards as shields. They also wore protective equipment including heat-resistant gloves and respirators. The 2014 Ukrainian Revolution was commonly described as an inspiration for Hong Kong protesters.

Protesters adopted different roles during demonstrations. Peaceful protesters chanted slogans, passed supplies, and volunteered as medics, while frontliners led the charge, extinguished tear gas with water, or neutralised them using objects such as traffic cones and kitchenware. Protesters have used laser pointers to distract the police, sprayed paint on surveillance cameras, and unfurled umbrellas to protect and conceal the identities of the group in action and to avoid facial recognition. When protesters departed via MTR, they often made piles of extra changes of clothes for other activists, and left money to purchase single-use tickets and avoid tracking via Octopus cards.

=== Offensive actions, petrol bombs, and arson ===
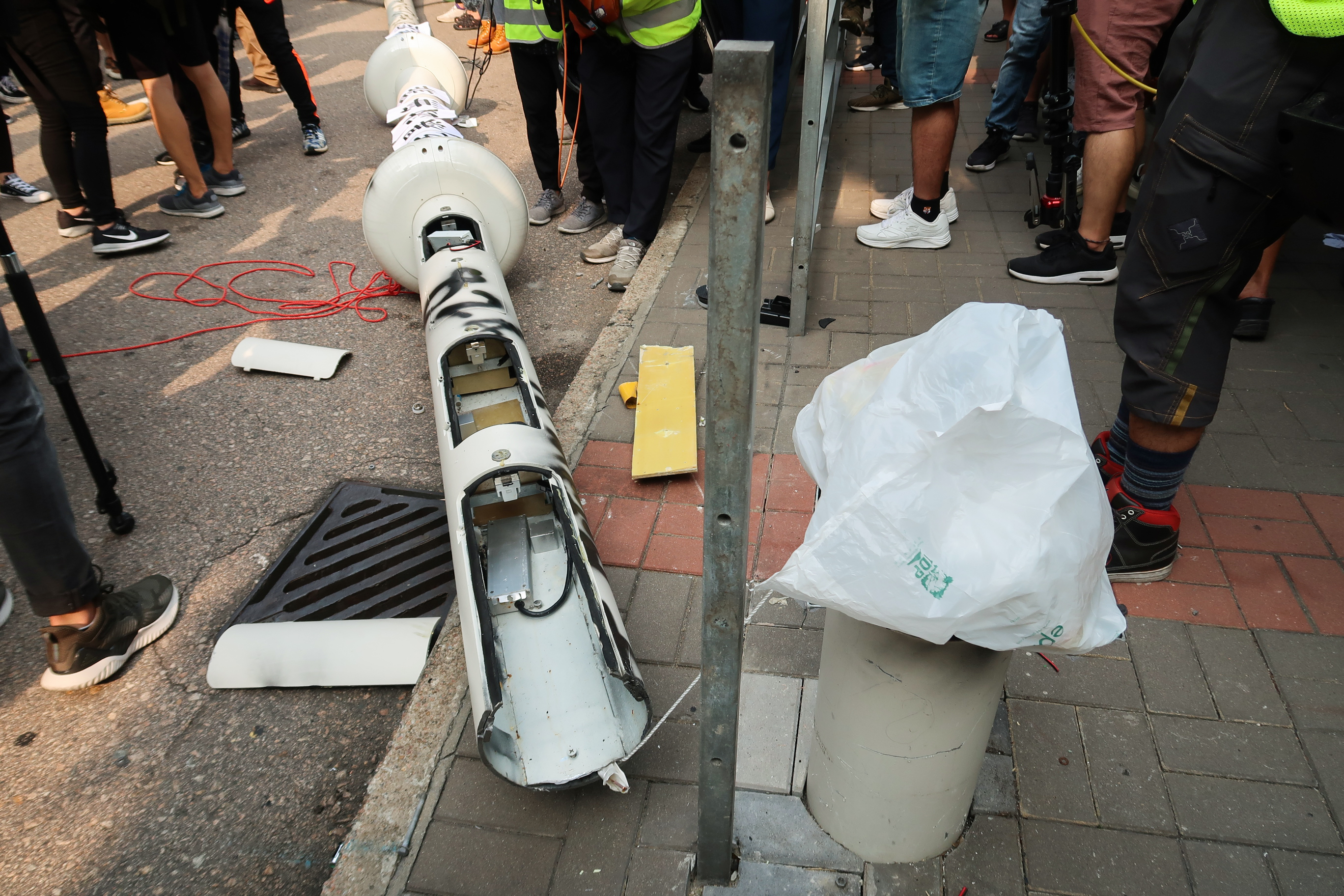
Surveillance lamppost brought down by protesters

The South China Morning Post reported that the confrontational tactics used by protesters evolved from vandalism to "a now familiar pattern", in which the protesters reportedly threw bricks, petrol bombs, corrosive liquid and other projectiles at police. Radical frontline protesters used petrol bombs as a weapon of choice against police. Between 9 June and 1 October 2019, fire services answered calls of 37 incidents involving firebombs thrown by protesters; objects such as rubbish bins were frequently set on fire. In total, the Hong Kong Fire Services Department responded to 319 fires during the same period. According to Secretary for Security John Lee, protesters had thrown more than 100 petrol bombs over a weekend of street battles with police in early September. One of the most significant pyres was lit near police headquarters in Wan Chai on 31 August, with the blaze triggering the sprinkler system of a nearby hotel. Mainland Chinese-linked shops and businesses were targeted and their premises set on fire; MTR and railway stations were set ablaze, and petrol bombs hurled at police.

Throughout the protests, there have been multiple reports of police injuries and assault of officers during clashes. The protesters occupied and vandalised the Legislative Council Complex and manhandled lawmakers who attempted to stop them. On 25 August 2019, hardline protesters began throwing petrol bombs at police. To prevent police from advancing towards protesters, soap and batteries were scattered on the ground. Tear gas canisters were put out with water or thrown back towards police. Also on that day, a group of police were chased and attacked by a larger crowd of protesters with makeshift weapons of sticks and rods. Police were outnumbered and the confrontation led to the first gunshot of the protests, fired into the air, as police retreated from the attacking crowd. During a protest inside a mall in Kwun Tong on 13 October, a police officer was slashed in the neck.

Some radical protesters have employed or prepared to employ homemade bombs. Senior bomb disposal officer Alick McWhirter described the acts as "an ongoing bombing campaign [...] that has been both violent and indiscriminate" designed to "intimidate in order to achieve political ends." The usage of bombs was first observed on 14 October 2019; the bomb was remotely triggered with a mobile phone when a police vehicle passed by about 2 metres away, but the detonation caused no injuries. The police conducted raids on explosives laboratories or caches, seized materials used for bomb-making, arrested several suspects involved in bomb plots, and defused bombs hidden in various locations. In January 2020, during a period where protesters attempted to pressure the government to shut down its border with mainland China, unexploded bombs were seized and defused by the police in Lo Wu and Shenzhen Bay control point.

=== Traffic cone method ===
Protesters using the traffic cone method to dispose tear gas, 2019

In 2019, Hong Kong protesters invented a way of using traffic cones to dispose tear gas when riot police are attempting to disperse a crowd. The method works by placing a traffic cone over the gas canister to trap the gas inside the cone and then by dousing the canister with water through an opening in the top of the cone. The method has been used at protests around the world, including in Chile and the United States, after videos on social media spread of the method being used during the Hong Kong protests.

The use of traffic cones was first documented in 2019 during the 2019–2020 Hong Kong protests, during which frontline protesters became adept at extinguishing tear gas. They formed special "firefighter" teams that sprang into action as soon as a tear gas canister was fired. These individuals generally wore personal protective equipment, including heat-proof gloves, or covered their arms and legs with cling film to prevent the painful skin irritation. Canisters were sometimes picked up and lobbed back at police or extinguished straight away with water or neutralised using objects such as traffic cones.

They shared information about models of 3M respirator filters which had been found to be most effective against tear gas, and where those models could be purchased. Other volunteers carried saline solutions to rinse the eyes of those affected. Specialized individuals sometimes act as tear gas medics, and another group, the "shield-bearers", protected the protesters from the direct physical impact of the grenades.

Dedicated units called "firefighter teams" are assigned to disposing of tear gas, which leaps into action as soon as a canister is fired. The technique requires water to hit the canister inside the traffic cone, meaning it often requires lots of water because it is difficult to aim inside the cone.

After online videos of the strategy spread, the technique became familiar across the world. In 2019-2020, the method was used by Chilean protesters against Primera Línea. In the 2020 George Floyd protests in Portland, Oregon, the traffic cone method was used. The method has also been used in the 2026 Delaney Hall protests.

=== Vandalism and violence ===
Companies linked to the mainland China have been targeted with graffiti and posters amid rising frustration that the Hong Kong government is failing to address demands of the protesters. At least two Bank of China ATMs were set on fire on 2 October. Some Starbucks outlets, which are operated by Maxim's Caterers, were also vandalised. Outlets of the Commercial Press, Hong Kong's oldest publishing house established in 1897 now owned by Sino United Publishing which is reportedly controlled by the Chinese Liaison Office, were attacked, with books burned. In separate incidents, several people threw a Chinese national flag into Victoria Harbour, and vandalised the offices of pro-Beijing lawmakers. A surveillance lamppost, feared by protesters to be used by the government to monitor its citizens, was dismantled by protesters during a protest in Kwun Tong on 24 August. Protesters have apologised for accidentally vandalising perceived "innocent" shops and banks by spray painting "sorry" on their property.

After a large number of Mass Transit Railway stations were vandalised and subjected to arson, Hong Kong's rail operator shut down all train services, as well as all light rail and MTR-operated bus services, on the night of 4 October. MTR has become a target of vandalism by protesters since the railway operator shut down four stations ahead of the protest on 24 August, which was authorised by the police, after being pressurised by Chinese media. MTR was also accused of transporting police officers and criticised for not releasing relevant CCTV footage of the 31 August Prince Edward station incident.

Violence was at times also directed towards alleged triad members. Two mahjong parlours in Tsuen Wan accused of having ties to the assailants who assaulted protesters during the 5 August general strike protest were vandalised and the staff scolded by protesters. In another incident at the airport, two mainland travellers, who the protesters accused of ties with the Chinese government, were forcefully detained by protesters for a number of hours, and were assaulted before they were released to paramedics. Hard-core protesters began attacking individuals and vandalising pro-Beijing storefronts, banks, cafes and subway entrances; the protesters describe vigilante attacks as "settling matters privately" (Chinese: 私了) as they became increasingly distrustful and wary towards the police as a law enforcement agency. On 6 October 2019, actress Celine Ma claimed she was physically attacked while she was filming a group of demonstrators vandalising a Bank of China ATM. She was then escorted away with help from Australian journalist Robert Ovadia. Her injury required stitches on her chin and the back of her head. A man was in critical condition after being doused in a flammable liquid and set on fire during an argument with protesters on 11 November.

== Alternative protests ==
=== Neighborhood Lennon Walls ===
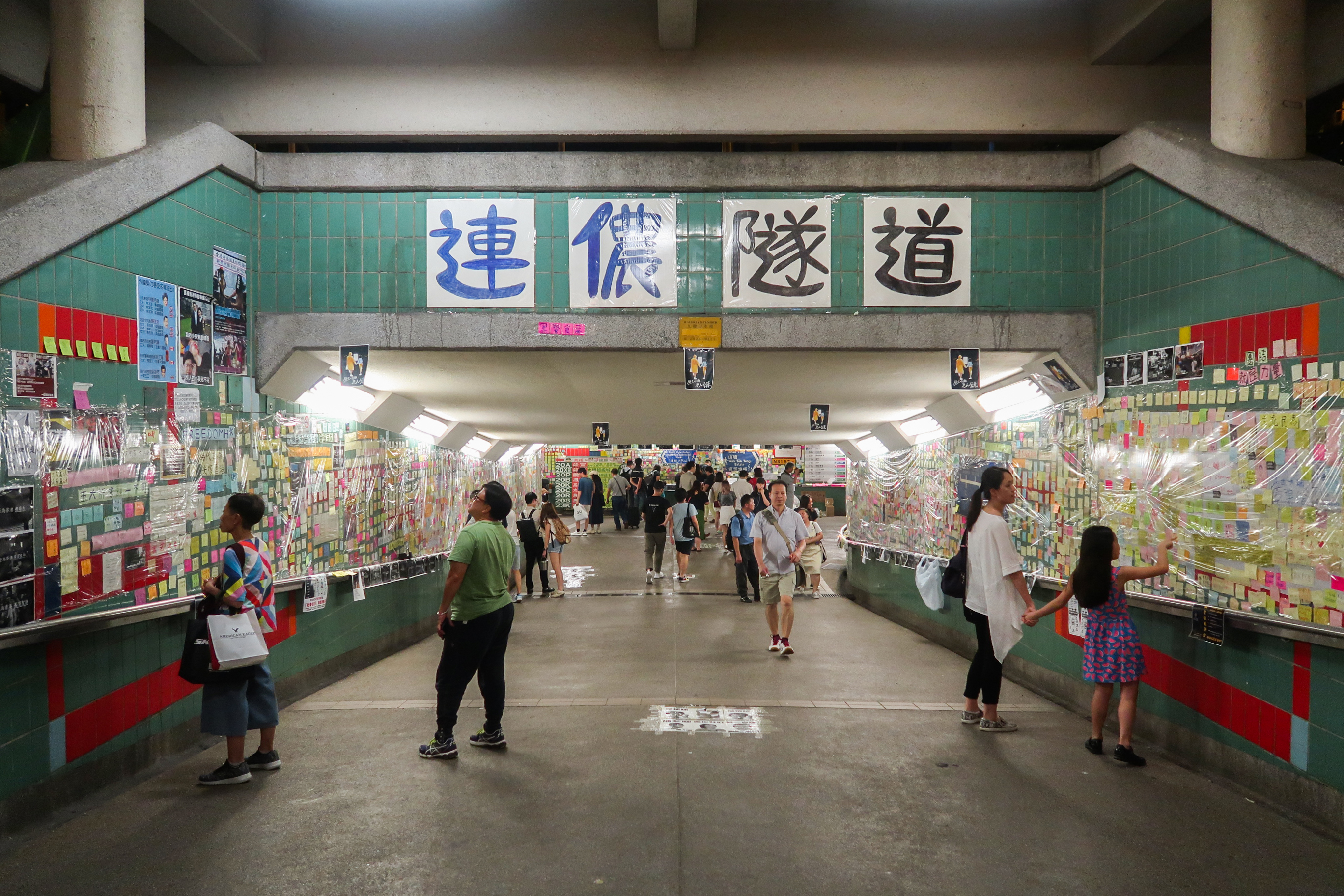
A tunnel near the Tai Po Market MTR station, dubbed as the "Lennon Tunnel."

The original Lennon Wall was set up in front of the Hong Kong Central Government Offices staircase. During the months of June and July 2019, Lennon Walls covered with post-it note messages for freedom and democracy have appeared throughout Hong Kong. Citizens also plastered Lennon Walls with various protest posters and arts to draw people's attention to the protests.

According to a crowd-sourced map of Hong Kong, there are over 150 Lennon Walls throughout the region. Lennon Walls have also appeared in Toronto, Vancouver, Tokyo, Berlin, London, Melbourne, Manchester, Sydney, Taipei, and Auckland. Messages of solidarity for the Hong Kong democracy movement have also been added to the original Lennon Wall in Prague. On 30 July, a female Hong Kong student was assaulted during a confrontation between pro-democracy and pro-China students while erecting a Lennon Wall at the University of Auckland.

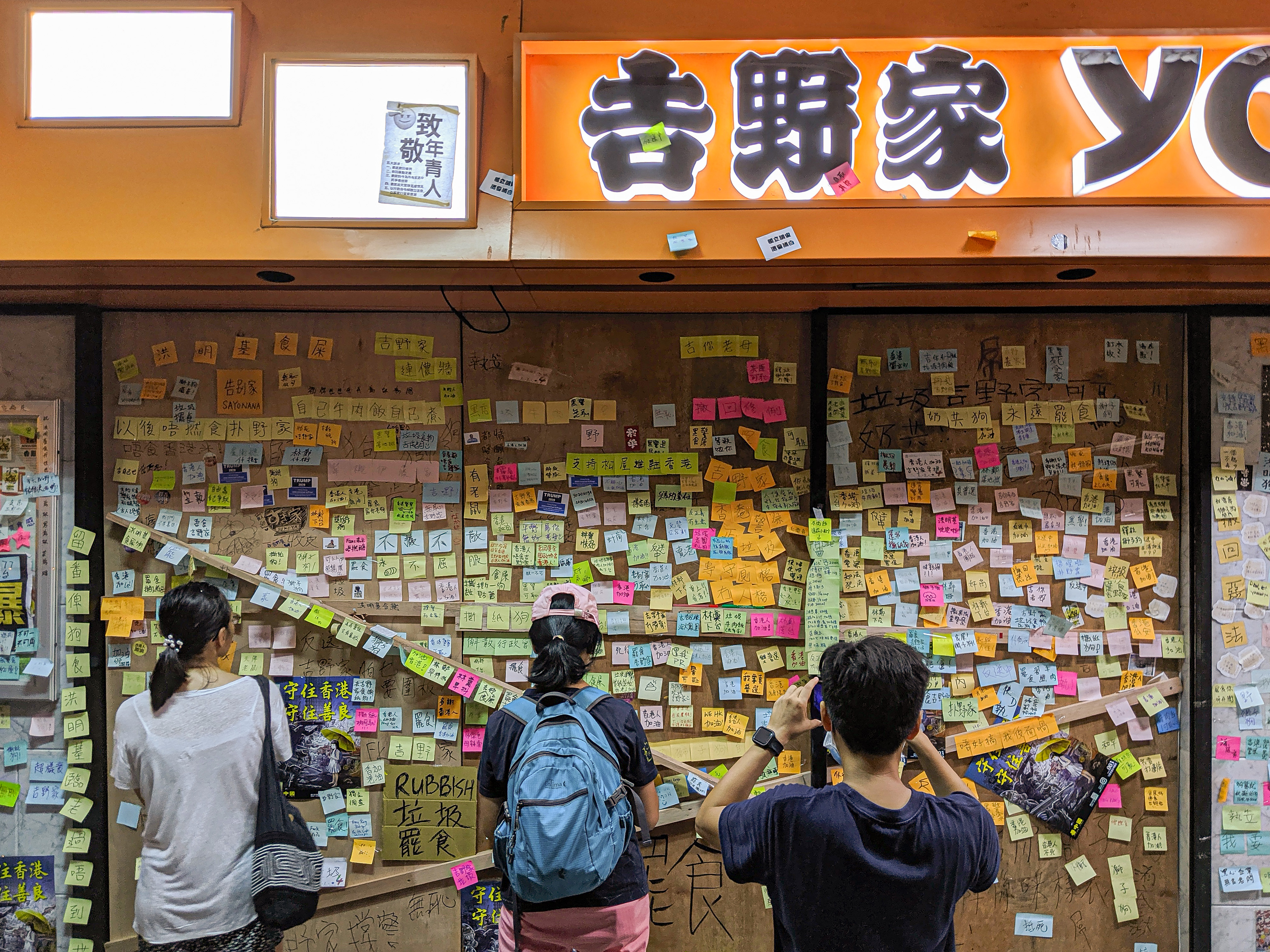
Lennon Wall outside a Yoshinoya fast-food chain, Hong Kong. A protest against their advertisement decisions.

=== Hunger strikes ===
A group of protesters were on hunger strike following the 1 July rally in Admiralty. Preacher Roy Chan initiated the action and has been joined by about 10 others, including Labour Party lawmaker Fernando Cheung. They camped near Harcourt Road in Admiralty, with many signs displayed to inform the public about their goals. At least five people have vowed to continue fasting until the extradition bill is officially withdrawn.

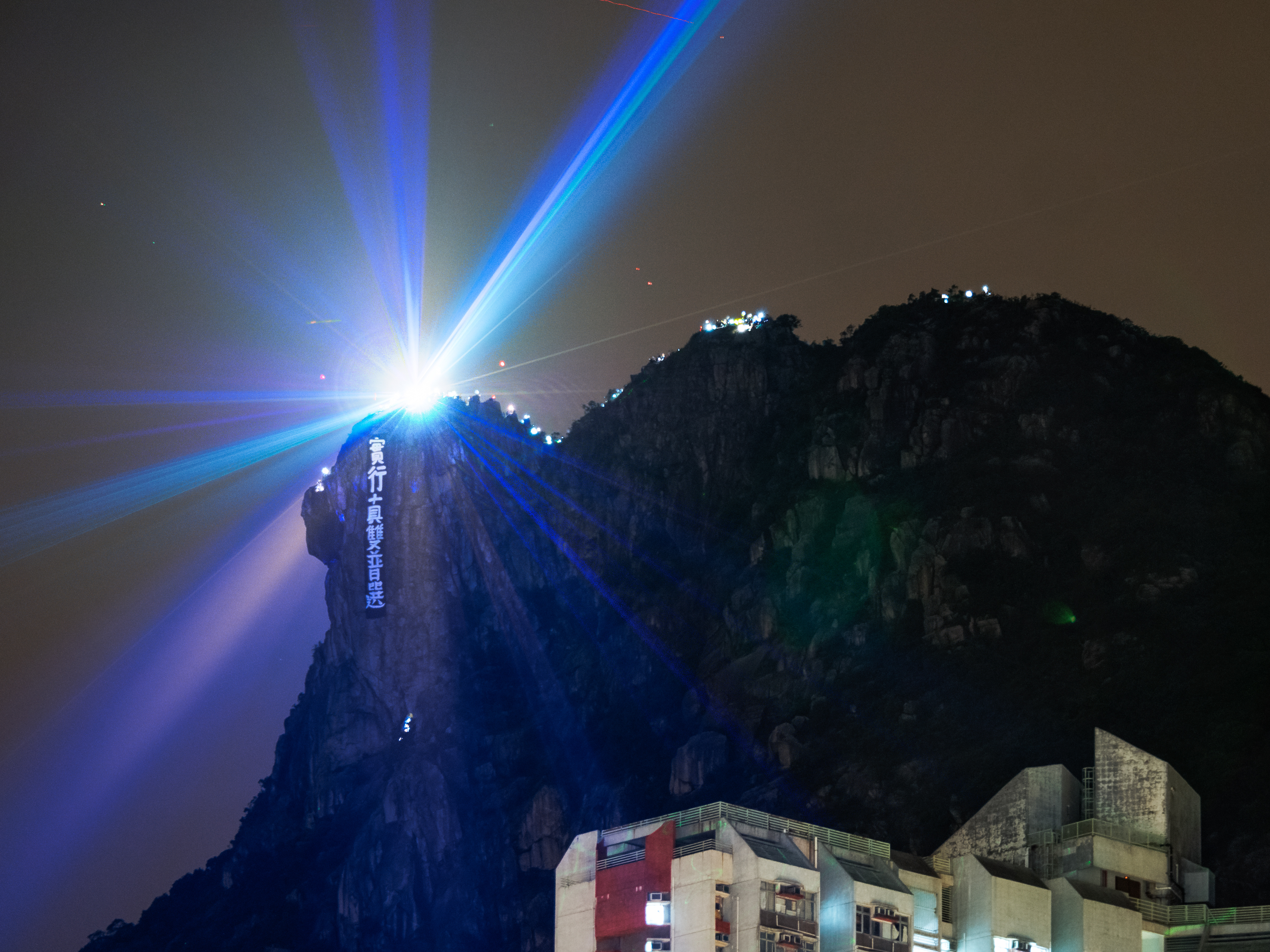
A black-with-white-font vertical protest banner unfurled on Lion Rock, 13 September 2019. It roughly translates to "We Demand Genuine Universal Suffrage".

=== Vertical protest banners ===
Banners have been hung on various hill tops and out of building windows in the 2019 protests. The first documented hilltop vertical protest banner was unfurled on Lion Rock during the 2014 Umbrella revolution. Vertical protest banners were also used during mass protests and marches, as well as hung inside shopping centers and on secondary school and university campuses.

=== Non co-operation movements ===
Some democracy activists have adopted civil disobedience and direct action tactics. Examples include disruption of government operations, occupation of areas near the Revenue Tower, and besieging Hong Kong Police Headquarters in Wan Chai.

In mid-June, protesters disrupted MTR services by blocking train doors and pressing emergency stop buttons in various train stations, delaying services. Demosistō also gathered at Mei Foo station to raise awareness for the issues and requested commuters to help "protect students." Disruption of MTR services continued after the Yuen Long violence on 21 July, with protesters obstructing train services at Admiralty station and requesting that the MTR Corporation be held accountable for mismanagement. Obstruction of MTR services received mixed responses from other commuters.

On 30 July, the non-cooperation movement again targeted MTR service during morning rush-hour. For about three hours, activists disrupted the Kwun Tong line at an interchange station. Due to service outages, MTR provided free bus transport to affected commuters. A train at North Point station on Hong Kong Island was also targeted by demonstrators. Rail staff had threatened to strike on 30 July, but railway unions did not officially endorse participation in strike actions.

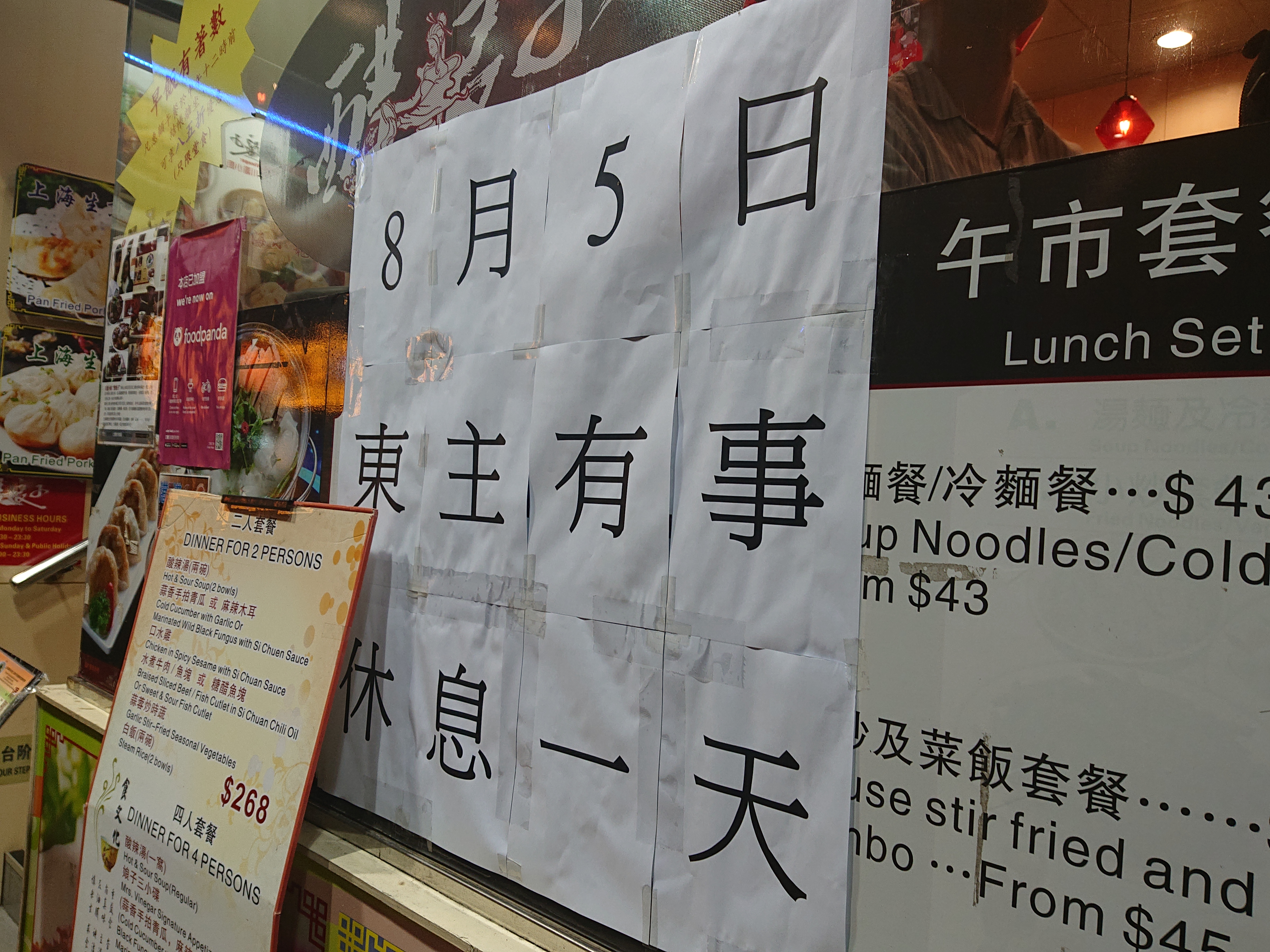
Restaurant notice of closure on 5 August

During the 5 August general strike, protesters blocked train doors in various MTR stations. As a result, a large extent of the MTR network was paralysed. The non-cooperation movement targeted rush-hour periods, thus impeding people from travelling to work, or returning home. The activists involved said their goal was to prevent passengers from reaching work in crucial business districts such as Central, Tsim Sha Tsui and Mong Kok. During the strike, a pregnant woman felt unwell and requested aid from paramedics while waiting in the train station for many hours.

On the same day, the movement also struck the roads, where protesters used their vehicles to disrupt traffic including stopping in lanes and driving slowly around roundabouts. Some protesters used various instruments including street-side railings, traffic cones, barricades and rubbish bins to blockade the roads which stopped a number of vehicles from passing through. The Cross-Harbour Tunnel, one of the busiest routes in Hong Kong, was briefly blocked on 3 August. Reports showed the Hong Kong International Airport was affected by strike actions, resulting in a large number of flight cancellations and delays. Photos showed many travellers waiting in the concourse.

Railway operator MTR's actions in the protests were criticised by protesters, leading to calls requesting Hong Kong citizens to jump over the station's turnstiles to evade fares. This prompted MTR to announce plans to recruit former members of the Brigade of Gurkhas in Hong Kong to tackle the non-co-operation movement and tighten up security.

=== Police station blockades ===
Starting in late June, it became somewhat a standard practice that peaceful marches during the day transformed into more radical direct actions at night, often targeting police stations with street protests, blockades, and vandalism. Many blockades were also solidarity actions in response to harsh policing tactics and recent arrests of democracy activists. Various police stations in Yuen Long, Tin Shui Wai, Ma On Shan, Tseung Kwan O, Kwun Tong, Tsim Sha Tsui and Sham Shui Po as well as the Police Headquarters were besieged. Protesters constructed barricades, vandalised HKPF buildings, hurled bricks and eggs, and painted graffiti slogans on exterior station walls.

Police station blockades continued into September as a routine and nightly demonstration tactic.

=== Human chain ===
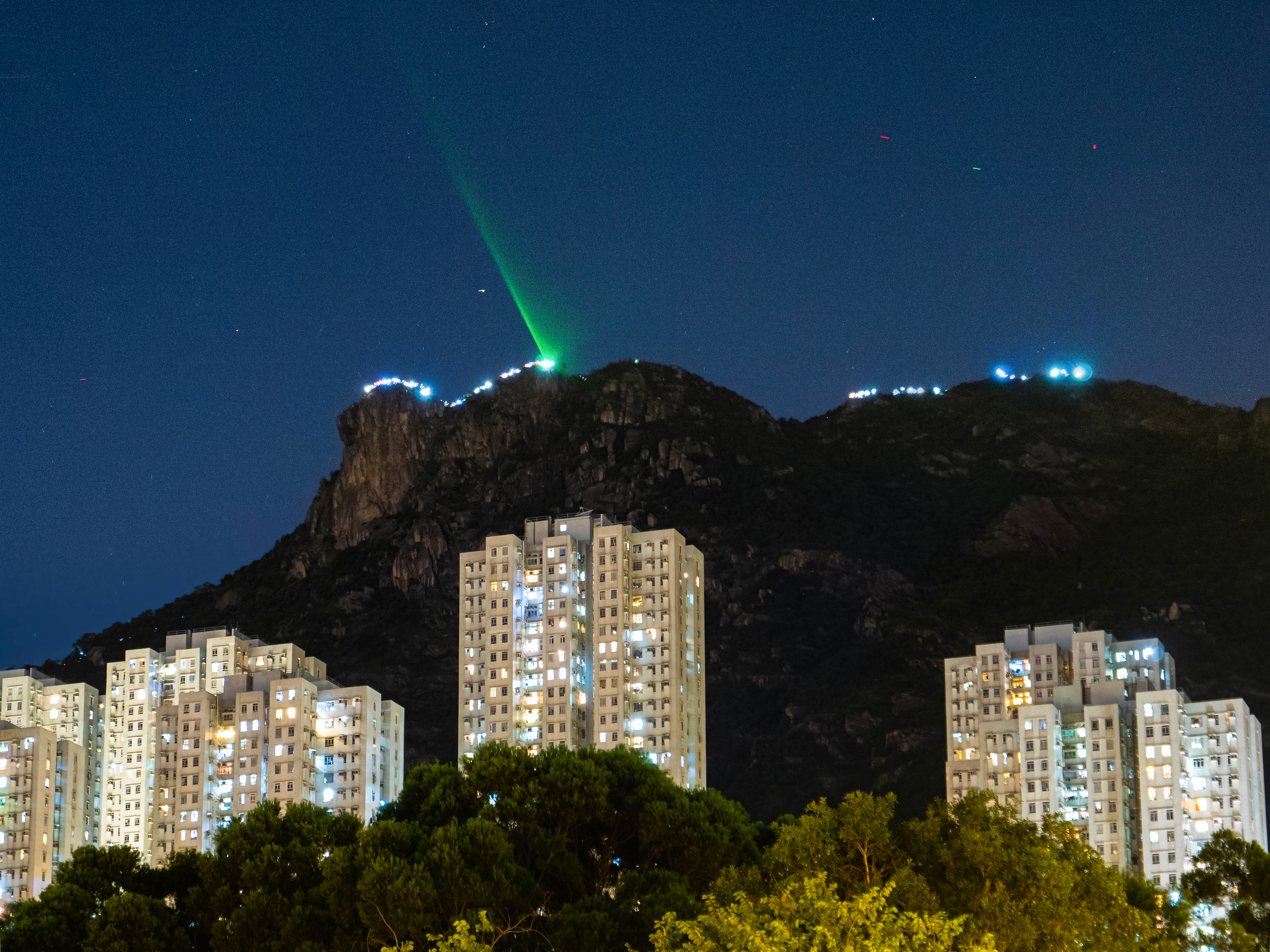
Over 1,000 trail runners and nature lovers gathered atop Lion Rock for The Hong Kong Way. 23 August 2019

On the evening of 23 August, an estimated 135,000 people participated in "The Hong Kong Way" campaign, to draw attention to the movement's five demands. They joined hands to create a human chain 50 kilometres long, stretching across both sides of Hong Kong harbour and over the top of Lion Rock. The action was inspired by a similar event that occurred 30 years ago, on 23 August 1989. The Baltic Way involved 2 million people, stretching 675 kilometres across the territories of Estonia, Latvia, and Lithuania, as a call for independence from Soviet Russia. The Hong Kong Way event was organised from the LIHKG forums, along with real-time Telegram chat groups to assist with creation of the human-chain. One participant at the event described this protest as very different from others in the past: "This time it demonstrates harmony and love rather than venting anger and hate. The spirit is unity."

Following the Hong Kong Way campaign, some secondary school students formed human chains around their schools during early September.

=== Nightly democracy chants ===
Protesters started the tradition of shouting slogans from their apartment windows at night. Beginning on 19 August, residents shouted near the window every night at 10 pm, so that neighbours and nearby residents may be cheered up until the protests and social struggles have finished. Chants for democracy and complaints about police and the government can be heard outside university dorms and in Hong Kong neighbourhoods throughout the city. The idea to have a free and communal "late night concert" initially spread from the LIHKG forum, and has caught on as a regular act of solidarity and way to air grievances in an interactive manner. Common phrases that protesters shout include "five demands, not one less", "liberate Hong Kong, the revolution of our times", and "Hongkongers, add oil".

=== 'Free HK' traffic lights ===
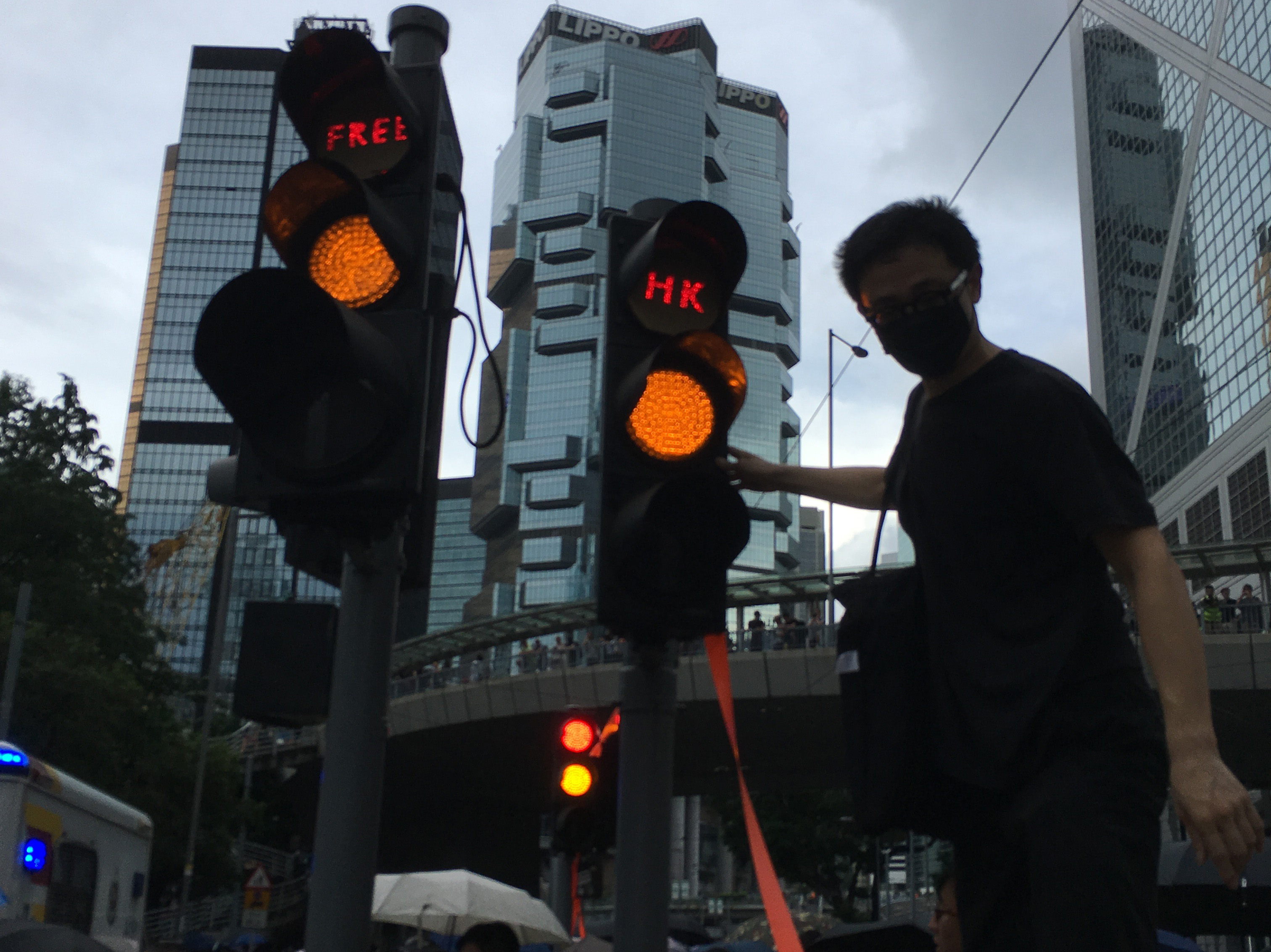
FREE HK slogan on traffic lights

Some traffic lights would light up with the words ‘Free HK’ slogan on it, during 2019–2020 Hong Kong protests. It was discovered near the Chief Executive's Office in Hong Kong and Chinese People's Liberation Army Forces Hong Kong Building, then widely circulated by media since 2 September 2019 protest.

=== Petition campaigns ===
From May 2019 onwards, multiple petitions against the Bill from over 200 secondary schools, various industries, professions, and neighbourhoods were created. More than 167,000 students, alumni and teachers from all public universities and one in seven secondary schools in Hong Kong, including St. Francis' Canossian College which Carrie Lam attended, also launched online petitions against the extradition bill in a snowballing campaign. St. Mary's Canossian College and Wah Yan College, Kowloon, which Secretary for Justice Teresa Cheng and Secretary for Security John Lee attended, respectively, also joined the campaign. Even the alumni, students and teachers at St. Stephen's College, which the victim in the Taiwan homicide case Poon Hiu-wing attended from Form 1 to Form 3, were unconvinced as they accused the government of using her case as a pretext to force the bill's passage.

Former government executives, including Anson Chan, the former Chief Secretary for Administration, issued several open letters to Carrie Lam, urging her to respond to the five core demands raised by protesters. About 230 civil servants from more than 40 government departments, including RTHK, Innovation and Technology Bureau, Fire Services Department, Customs and Excise Department, Immigration Department and the Correctional Services Department also issued a joint statement condemning Lam's administration and demanding key officials involved in the incident, including Lam, John Lee, Teresa Cheng and Stephen Lo to resign while concealing their identities. The civil servants also threatened to launch a labour strike to paralyse the government's operations if the core demands are not met.

== Economic protests ==
=== Yellow economic circle ===
Further to the movement to boycott pro-government merchants and restaurants, the pro-democracy protesters have initiated what they call "Yellow Economic Circle", an attempt to segregate merchants into pro-democracy or pro-government. Protesters, activists and sympathizers of the protest movement would only patronise shops which have expressed their support for the protest movement, and boycotted shops which have expressed an anti-protest view and Chinese-funded companies. Through the Economic Circle, activists expected that this would create a self-sufficient economy, and that capital earned by "yellow" shops could flow back to aid the protest movement. This partly is a response to the politics-oriented business model of the communist party. One prominent example being that the communist party, through various state-owned enterprises and business influences, has boycotted the pro-democracy newspaper Apple Daily since 1997 through not placing advertising on the newspaper. This was also a response to some corporations making decisions that harmed the protest movement, such as firing employees who have expressed support for the protests. Yellow shops close to each other will occasionally join to organise crossover promotions, and some have collaborated with pro-democratic District Councilors to set up Lunar New Year Fairs across the city in January 2020.

The "Yellow Economic Circle" has received criticism from some sides, based on a theory that it does not abide by the main principle of free economy. It has also been criticised as immoral on the grounds of its degree of arbitrariness, and its supposed negative effect on small shops. The Secretary of Economics and Commerce of the Hong Kong Government Edward Yau has spoken on the media against this segregation of businesses basing on political inclination. Popular political commentator To Kit opined it is just a normal development of the democratic movement, and questioned why the government has never said a word on communist party and the governments boycotting against the Apple Daily newspaper since 1997. Simon Shen, a political scientist, suggested that the Economic Circle could be an example of "identity economy" and predicted that the businesses involved could enjoy a "potential market worth of more than HK$100 billion". It is anticipated this economic movement on politics will be ongoing and have a longer term influence.

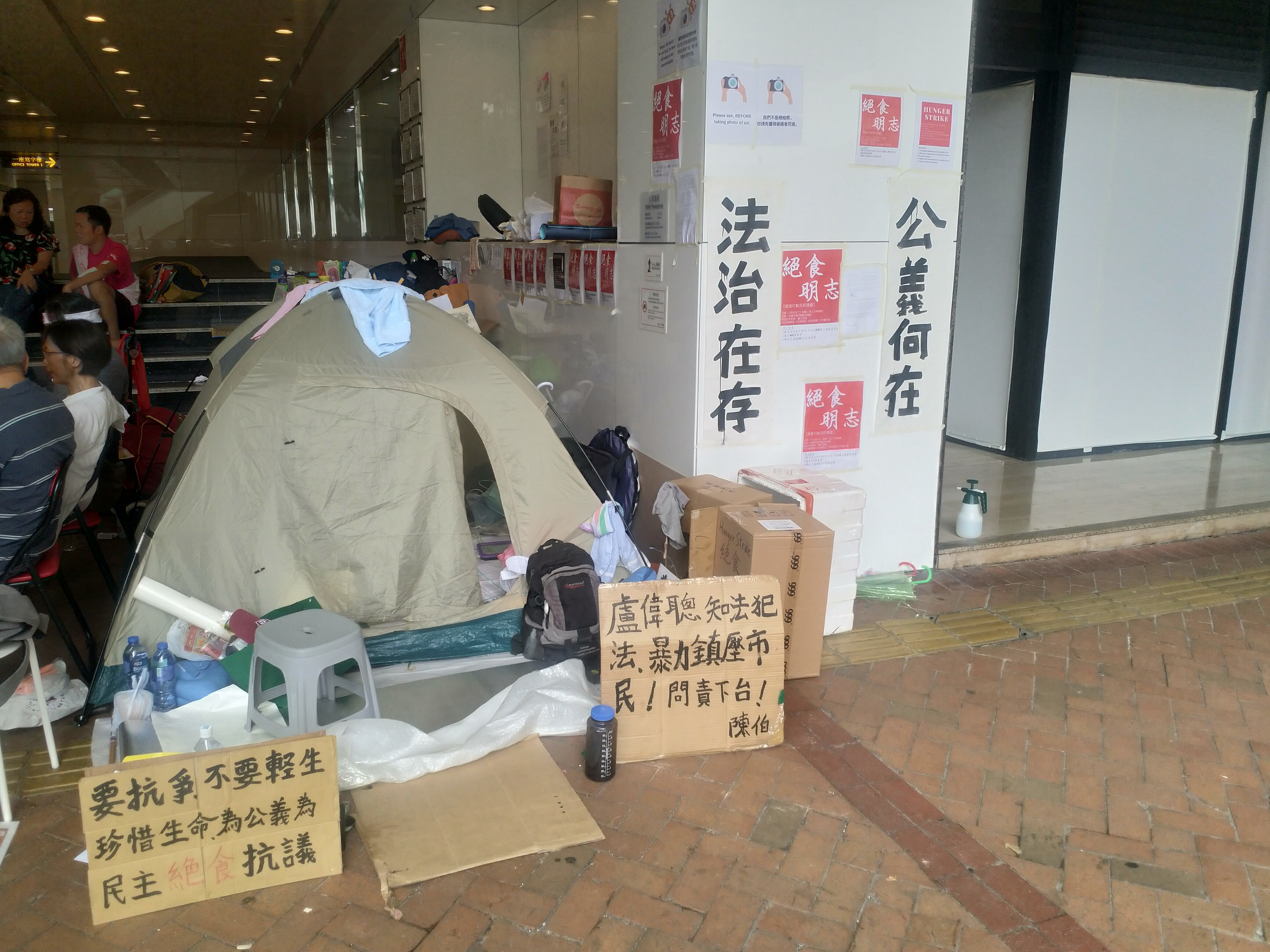
Hunger strikers outside Admiralty Centre. 9 July 2019

=== Boycotts ===
The Communications Authority received approximately 12,000 complaints criticising TVB's coverage for favouring the pro-establishment camp and the Chinese Communist Party (CCP). Protesters have claimed that TVB presented an over-simplified narrative with limited information, therefore avoiding more overt censorship methods. In light of this the Hong Kong branch of Pocari Sweat withdrew their advertisements from TVB to the delight of anti-extradition protesters while also angering Mainland consumers. Netizens have then launched a campaign to pressurise corporations to stop placing advertisements on TVB.

After an advertisement satirising police brutality appeared on the company's Facebook page, the local franchise of Japanese fast-food chain Yoshinoya said it had severed ties with their partnering marketing agency. This action received criticisms from protesters. Protesters also started an online campaign named "Bye Buy Day HK", which urged activists to spend less money on every Friday and Saturday and avoided shopping or dining at pro-Beijing firms. A mobile app was developed help people identify shops that have supported the protest movement and shops that have links with China.

Maxim's Caterers became a target for the protesters after Annie Wu, the daughter of the corporation's founder, called protesters "rioters" and made unsubstantiated claims about the protests at the United Nations Human Rights Council, and threatened to expel students who took part in the class boycotts at Chinese Foundation Secondary School, a school she helped found. All of its restaurants and outlets, including franchises such as Starbucks, were boycotted by protesters. Maxim's later distanced itself from these claims.

Snack shop chain Best Mart 360 became a target of the protesters after it was accused of having ties to the "Fujian gangs" who assaulted protesters in North Point in August. As of 28 November 2019, of the 102 stores of the snack food chain, 75 had been trashed or firebombed a total of 180 times. Best Mart 360 then announced plans to scale back its operation in Hong Kong and turned to expand its market in Macau and mainland China.

== Art and music ==
Protesters created derivative works and original artworks to promote upcoming protests, spread messages of unity and criticise the government. Protesters have also begun folding origami cranes named "freenix", which was viewed as the embodiment of peace and hope. Protesters also crowdfunded a 4-meter-tall pro-democracy statue named Lady Liberty Hong Kong. The statue's design originates from the reverse delivery demonstrator's costume: wearing a yellow helmet, eye mask, and respirator; the right hand is holding an umbrella; the left hand is holding a flag which reads "Liberate Hong Kong, the revolution of our times". The Pepe the Frog cartoon character has been widely used by pro-democracy protesters. This usage is not connected to the character's association with the alt-right in other parts of the world.

A 1974 Christian hymn called "Sing Hallelujah to the Lord" has become the "unofficial anthem" of the anti-extradition protests as it was heard everywhere at the many protest sites during the early stage of the protests. "Do You Hear the People Sing", the unofficial anthem for the Umbrella Movement in 2014, has also resurfaced as a commonly sung song during the protest. A group of anonymous composers has written the song "Glory to Hong Kong", which became the theme of the protest and was regarded as Hong Kong's unofficial national anthem by protestors. On the same night, the song was also publicly sung at more than a dozen shopping malls across Hong Kong.

Some protesters have waved the United States flag in support of the prospective introduction of the Hong Kong Human Rights and Democracy Act, a bill proposed by the US Congress. Others have waved a Union Jack as well as the Flag of the Republic of China and even South Africa. The Dragon and Lion flag used by Hong Kong during the colonial era can also be seen during the protests, though its usage has often been disputed.

Protesters also created the wilted or bloodied bauhinia flower flag, which was modified from the Hong Kong regional flag. A black and white version of the Hong Kong flag, referred to as "Black Bauhinia", has also been seen in protests. Protesters have also created the Chinazi flag by combining the flag of People's Republic of China and the flag of the Nazi Party to draw comparisons between the two. Variations include golden stars forming the Nazi swastika on a red background and Nazi swastikas replacing the golden stars on the Chinese flag.

== Technology ==
=== Online activism ===
Protesters also took to the Internet to exchange information and ideas. Netizens used the popular online forum LIHKG to gain traction for protests and to brainstorm and vote for ideas. These included disrupting MTR services, gathering for vigils, organising "picnics" (a term used to avoid surveillance), and making anti-extradition bill memes that appeal to conservative values so that Hong Kong elderly would better understand the anti-extradition rationale. Protesters have also been using Telegram, an optionally end-to-end encrypted messaging service, to communicate to conceal identities and try to prevent tracking by the Chinese government and Hong Kong Police Force. The app's servers were under denial-of-service attacks on 12 June. The app's founder Pavel Durov identified the origin of the attack as China, and stated that it "coincided in time with protests in Hong Kong."

Protesters have also developed a mobile app named "HKmap.live", which crowdsources the location of police and anti-government protesters. The app was available on the iOS App Store briefly after Apple initially rejected the app, though Apple subsequently removed the app following pressure from China. To further facilitate the Yellow Economic Circle, apps were developed to help readers to identify the political orientation of various shops and companies.

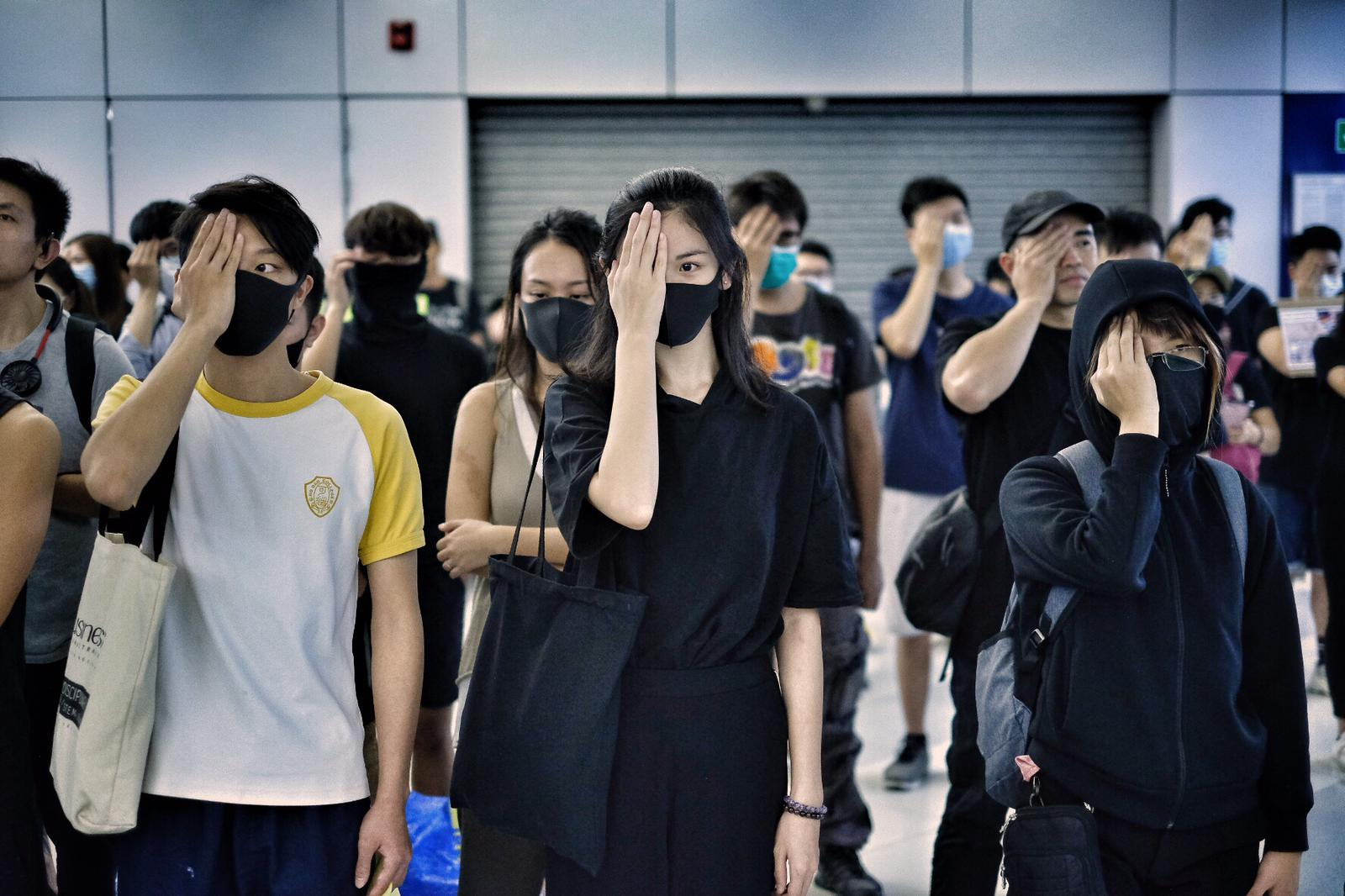
Protesters covering their right eye

After 11 August, when a protester's right eye was allegedly ruptured by bean bag rounds, netizens have started the #Eye4HK campaign, calling people around the world to take a photo of themselves covering their right eye and share it on social media to show support to the movement and the anti-extradition protesters.

The protests have seen an increase in the spread of disinformation from both protesters and government supporters which have led to heightened reactions and polarisation among the public. Within the Citizens' press conference (see below), a group on Telegram is devoted to countering the "Pro-Beijing trolls – the so-called 50-cent army, named for the price they are supposedly paid for each post" plus the "state-backed media and botnets [who] have been employed to pump out huge quantities of disinformation and misinformation, designed to undermine the protesters as rioters and stooges of foreign powers". (Research by Fu King-wa of the University of Hong Kong "found that 20% of the feeds related to the Hong Kong protests on Twitter have been posted by "fake accounts," which display minimal interaction with other users", a much higher figure than the 10% fake feeds posting on the 2016 United States Presidential election where Russia allegedly tried to skew the outcome. In August 2019, Facebook and Twitter blocked "tens of thousands of accounts that they said were connected to [China's] state-backed misinformation campaigns".) The Telegram group's leader Shirley said "We invent memes, GIFs [short, animated images] and hashtags for Twitter feeds to attract attention. On the other hand, we post more in-depth articles on online forums like Reddit and Quora, where we want to establish meaningful conversations for people around the world to understand the situation in Hong Kong," she said. "In terms of size, we can never compete with the 50-cent army. But I believe authentic interactions are much more powerful than spam comments."

A game on Steam, titled Liberate Hong Kong, was released that allows players to play as a protester avoiding the riot police. The developers created the game to spread awareness of the protests and to test the boundaries of online gaming platforms on censorship, following Blitzchung controversy which saw video game company Blizzard Entertainment banning an eSports player from joining tournaments after he expressed support for the protests. During the coronavirus crisis, protesters have used video game Animal Crossing: New Horizons as a platform to protests as social gathering was discouraged. Protesters imported flags containing protest slogans such as "Liberate Hong Kong, revolution of our time" and funeral photographs of CCP general secretary Xi Jinping in the game as part of the virtual protests. Chinese online storefronts including Taobao then removed the game from sales.

Activists also took to editing the Wikipedia pages of the Hong Kong police and Carrie Lam, leading to "editing wars" and the need to restrict editing on controversial pages.

There have been reports of protestors using hidden language to dodge security laws, including wordplay and the repurposing of CCP literature to express dissent.

=== Doxing ===
As of 20 December 2019, the Office of the Privacy Commissioner for Personal Data (PCPD), a statutory body of the Hong Kong government, had received reports of or discovered 4,359 cases of doxing relating to the protests. Cases involving police officers or their family members comprised 36% of all reported or discovered cases of doxing; other cases involved other targets such as pro-government public figures, protesters, and anti-government citizens. These cases of doxing originated from sixteen online platforms and forums.

Police have found a website run by the hacktivist group Anonymous that disclosed personal data of more than 600 officers. In early July, the police arrested eight people in connection to the alleged doxing. In separate incidents, police targeted activists for their involvement in Telegram chat groups: during June and July, two people were arrested for conspiracy, under accusations of administering chat groups, and told that investigations would continue. However, neither has been charged with a crime.

The New York Times reported that a Telegram channel named 'Dadfindboy' (Chinese: 老豆搵仔) was used for doxing police officers. Personal information and photos of family members were revealed along with abusive language. The channel had more than 50,000 subscribers, and featured calls for violence against the police. The personal information of hundreds of officers and their family members had been released online as early as 19 June 2019. The police arrested nine people on doxing related offences on 3 July 2019. As of 28 August 2019, the PCPD had recommended an investigation into hundreds of cases that involved personal data leaks and related cyberbullying of police and their families, some of which involved threatening messages directed at the children of police officers.

Some protesters found their personal information and photos circulating on pro-Beijing circles on Facebook and other social media platforms after being stopped and searched by police, suspecting police to have leaked the photos they took during the stop-and-searches. In a response, the police said they had procedures to ensure that their members comply with privacy laws. HK Leaks, an anonymous website based in Russia, has doxxed about 200 people seen as supportive of the protests. An Apple Daily reporter who was doxed by the website was targeted by sexual harassment via "hundreds of threatening calls". As of 1 November, the site remained online. The website uses 'bulletproof' anonymous hosting, also used by imageboard website 8chan, designed to evade prosecution, and has shifted its domain name three times since August. Maarten Schenk, co-founder of the fact-check site Lead Stories, said that the site "seems to be really well set up to reveal as little as possible". The site has been promoted by groups linked to the CCP, including the Communist Youth League and Global Times.

In response to protester tensions against the police, a court injunction against doxxing police officers was issued on 25 October 2019. On 17 June 2020, after the sentencing of a person, Mr Justice Russell Coleman stated that "Court orders are made to be obeyed – they are not guidelines. If such doxxing activities are continued in breach of the court’s order … after this decision, those persons may not be so fortunate in avoiding a custodial sentence."

=== AirDrop broadcast ===
In June and July, protesters in Hong Kong used Apple devices' AirDrop feature to broadcast anti-extradition bill information to in public, such as inside MTR trains, allowing recipients to read about concerns regarding the proposed law, aiming to raise awareness among the residents in Hong Kong.

During the 7 July protest in Tsim Sha Tsui, a major tourist district, protesters again used AirDrop to share information regarding protests and concerns about the bill with tourists from mainland China. Some shared QR codes that looked like "free money" from Alipay and WeChat Pay, but actually redirected to information–written in Simplified Chinese–about the on-going democratic movement. Because AirDrop creates a direct link between local devices, the technology bypasses mainland China's censorship efforts that have distorted and limited information about extradition bill protests.

=== Peer-to-peer mesh broadcasting ===
Protesters had already eschewed traditional SMS, email, and WeChat, which are monitored by the state or are easily monitored. With the looming possibility that the government may enact emergency legislation, including measures to cut off Internet connectivity, Hong Kong has seen a rapid uptake of a smartphone ad hoc network software package called Bridgefy, a peer-to-peer bluetooth mesh networking application. Although the Bluetooth protocol is not secure, and the metadata can also be pinpointed by those with the technical means, the app allows transmission of messages without an Internet connection. The app functions by networking users' standard Bluetooth connections through the creation of a mesh network across an entire city. Messages transit via other Bridgefy users' phones until they reach the intended target. Direct messages are encrypted, while publicly broadcast messages are not. The broadcast mode allows messages to be sent to all users within immediate range. The app publisher announced that downloads had increased forty-fold over the month of August, with 60,000 app installations in the last week of August alone, most of them from Hong Kong. In the 2014 Hong Kong protests, FireChat had been used for smartphone ad hoc networking.

=== Crowdfunding ===
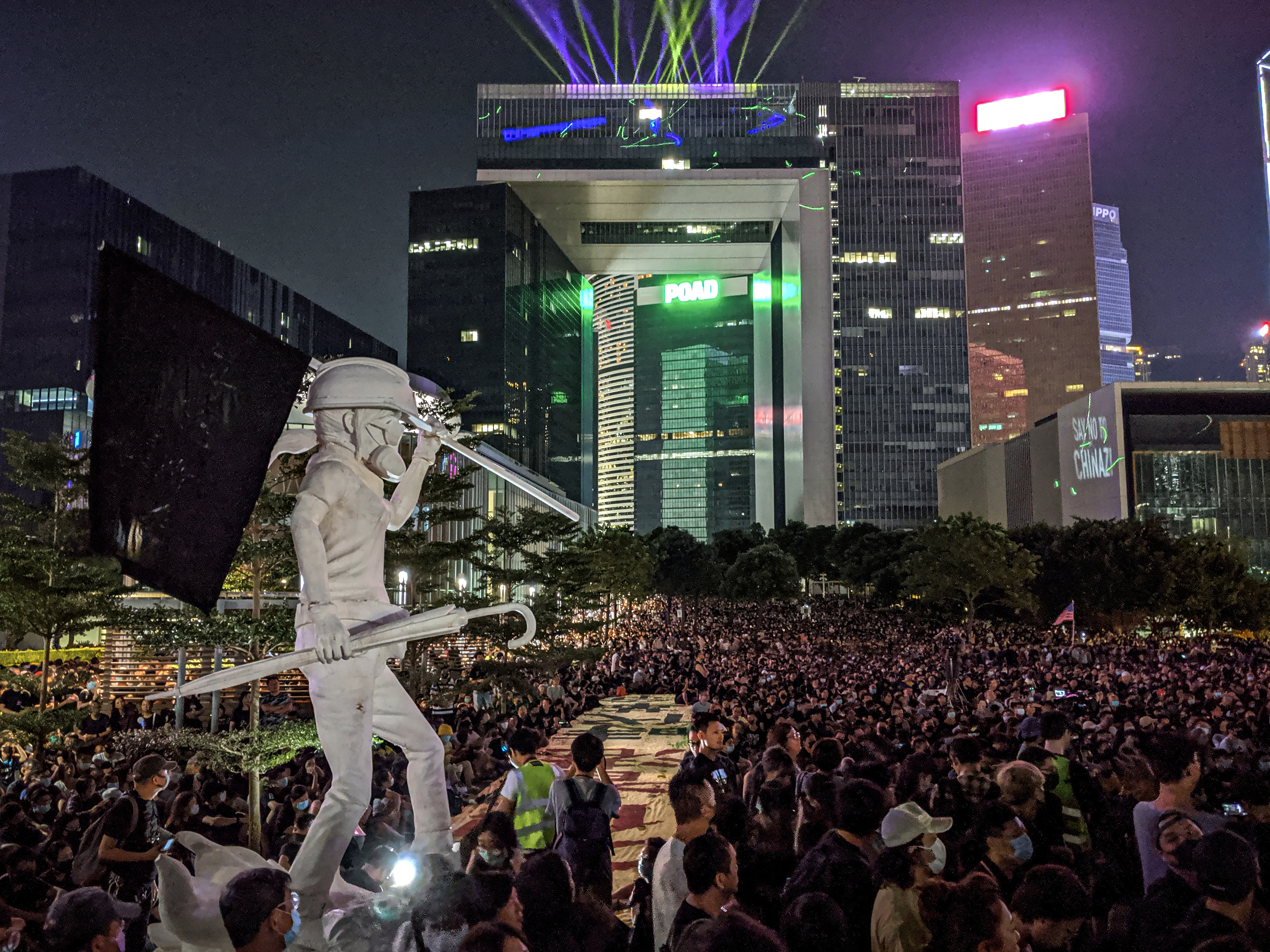
The crowdfunding campaign for the production of the Lady Liberty of Hong Kong statue reached its goal within 6 hours.

In addition to launching a crowdfunding campaign to place advertisement in major international newspapers, Hong Kong residents also raised funds to support the legal fees and the medical expenses for the detainees and the injured protesters respectively. For instance, the 612 Humanitarian Relief Fund raised more than HK$12 million in a month. Another organisation offering financial aid to the protesters was Spark Alliance, though the police and HSBC seized over HK$70 million (US$9 million) in funds for the protests in December 2019 and arrested three men and one woman, all responsible for operating the group, for "suspected money laundering".

The pro-democracy statue "Lady Liberty Hong Kong" also reached its goal of raising HK$200,000 within six hours.

== Publicity ==
=== Advertising campaign ===
In June, protesters launched an online crowdfunding campaign to place open letters as full-page ads in major international newspapers before the 28–29 June G20 Summit in Osaka, Japan to raise global awareness and appeal for world leaders' intervention on the bill, urging everyone to "ally with [them]" and to "[demand] the preservation of Hong Kong's freedom and autonomy under the Chinese government." The goal to raise HK$3 million was accomplished in less than four hours, and successfully raised HK$5.45 million in less than six hours. The open letter was published by popular international newspapers including The New York Times, The Guardian, Japan Times, The Globe and Mail, Süddeutsche Zeitung, The Chosun Ilbo, Le Monde and the online version of Politico Europe. The advertisements were printed in the local languages of the readership for each periodical, and while graphic design and layout varies, most included the slogan and appeal to "Stand with Hong Kong at G20" along with the open letter.

A GoFundMe campaign was started on 11 August 2019 to raise funds for a second advertising campaign. It raised US$1.97 million in two hours with contributions from over 22,500 people. The proceeds were used to again place open letters as full-page ads in 13 major international newspapers including the Globe and Mail, New York Times, Le Monde, El Mundo, and Kyunghyang Shinmun. The ads appeared in the newspapers on 17 August 2019.

Industry experts considered the advertisement campaign of the protesters as more effective than one which the Hong Kong government launched after the announcement of the withdrawal of the extradition bill in September 2019, in which it aimed to reassure investors and encourage visitors.

=== Citizens' press conference ===
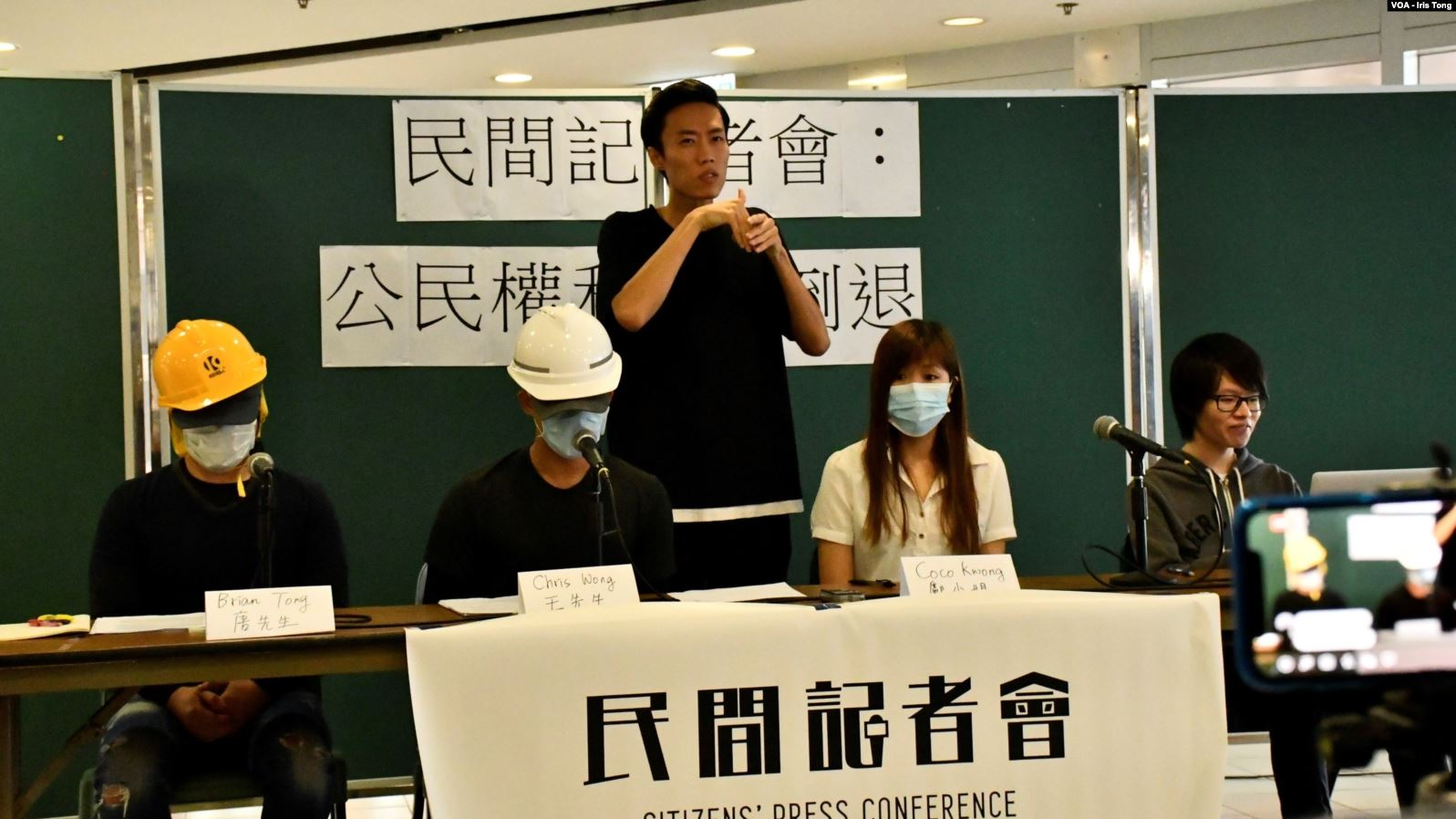
Citizens' press conference held by protesters. 19 August 2019

A group of protesters held a citizens' press conference, hoping to "broadcast under-represented voices" and their own perspectives to the public. This was a response to daily police press briefings, which they claim to spread "malicious distortions" and "untruth", and that they intended for these press conferences to "act as a counterweight to the government's monopoly on political discourse." In the press conferences, they would wear black, put on face masks and safety helmets, and conduct the discussion in both Cantonese and English, along with a sign language interpreter. These press conferences were coordinated using Telegram and LIHKG, and the speakers stressed that they are not the leaders of the movement but wish to speak for the average protesters. Quartz described that such tactic is a "battlefront" in public relations with the government.

According to Bruce Lui of the Hong Kong Baptist University, the "Citizens' Press Conference has won over hearts and minds. Most importantly, it presents to the public what the authority lacks – authenticity and sincerity. People here are fed up with canned speeches and scripted responses."
