= Qualcomm Wi-Fi SON =

Wireless internet technology

Qualcomm Wi-Fi SON (Self-Organizing Network) is a solution developed by Qualcomm for Wi-Fi networks to simply and automatically select and link different wireless networking devices together, using the concept of "mesh networking". It is supposed to improve network coverage in different corners in a house or an apartment, and also provide improved security. Note that the technology behind the solution is more like mesh networking than cellular self-organizing network which would have included dynamical adjustment between different access points and client devices.
