= Commotion Wireless =

Open-source wireless mesh network

- License: GNU GPL
- Website: www.commotionwireless.net

Commotion Wireless was an open-source Wireless mesh network for electronic communication. The project was developed by the Open Technology Institute, and development included a $2 million grant from the United States Department of State in 2011 for use as a mobile ad hoc network (MANET), concomitant with the Arab Spring. It was preliminarily deployed in Detroit in late 2012, and launched generally in March 2013. The project was called an "Internet in a Suitcase".

Commotion 1.0, the first non-beta release, was launched on December 30, 2013.

After an initial flurry of attention, the project did not prove sustainable. The code development profiles for the project have not been updated since 2016, and the project's website has been offline since approximately September 2024.

Commotion relied on several open source projects: OLSR, OpenWrt, OpenBTS, and Serval project.

== Supported hardware ==
Ubiquiti:

- PicoStation M2, Release 1 & 1.1, DR2
- Bullet M2/M5, Release 1 & 1.1, DR2
- NanoStation M2/M5, Release 1 & 1.1, DR2
- Rocket M2/M5, Release 1 & 1.1, DR2
- UniFi AP, Release 1 & 1.1
- UniFi Outdoor, Release 1 & 1.1

TP-Link:

- TL-WDR3600, Release 1.1
- TL-WDR4300, Release 1.1

Mikrotik:

- RB411AH, Release 1.1

== See also ==
- List of router and firewall distributions
