= Serval Project =

Project to enable peer to peer calling and texting on cellular devices

- Type of project: free and open-source software, mesh networking, mobile software
- Products: Serval Mesh
- Funding: Grants and donations
- Website: www.servalproject.org

The Serval Project (often referred to as Serval) is a project financed by the Shuttleworth Foundation, as well as various other organisations and accepting individual donations. It is headquartered at Flinders University in Adelaide, Australia. The project aims to develop technology that can be used to create direct connections between cellular phones through their Wi-Fi interfaces, without the need of a mobile phone operator. The technology allows for live voice calls whenever the mesh is able to find a route between the participants. Text messages and other data can be communicated using a store and forward system called Rhizome, allowing communication over unlimited distances and without a stable live mesh connection between all participants.

The Serval Project includes a collaborate mapping application intended to support disaster relief and recovery efforts. A "mesh extender" is being developed, which establishes a short range Serval mesh over Wi-Fi and joins it with other more distant meshes by linking to other mesh extenders over packet radio operating in the ISM 915 MHz band.

== Serval Mesh ==
The Serval Mesh
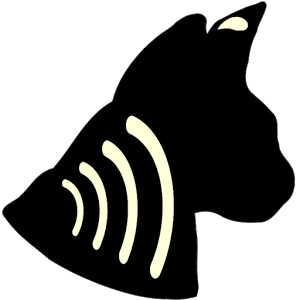
- Developer: Serval Project
- Stable release: 0.93 (May 15, 2016; 9 years ago)
- Operating system: Android 2.2 or later
- Size: 1.8 MB
- Type: mesh networking
- License: free software
- Website: www.servalproject.org

Serval Mesh is an Android application and the Serval Project's flagship product. It is currently distributed through various application distribution platforms and repositories and can also be downloaded directly from the project's website. The application may be shared directly from one device to others nearby over Wi-Fi or Bluetooth.

The Serval Mesh application is built out of two components: a user interface called Batphone, and a core networking, encryption, and file sharing component called Serval DNA. The Batphone source code is licensed to the public under the terms of the GPLv3 license, whereas the Serval DNA source code is licensed under the terms of the GPLv2 license.

== See also ==
- Smartphone ad hoc networks
- Similar projects
  - Briar (software)
  - B.A.T.M.A.N.
  - FireChat
