= Smartphone ad hoc network =

Wireless ad hoc network that uses smartphones

Smartphone ad hoc networks (SPANs; also smart phone ad hoc networks) are wireless ad hoc networks that use smartphones. Once embedded with ad hoc networking technology, a group of smartphones in close proximity can together create an ad hoc network. Smart phone ad hoc networks use the existing hardware (primarily Bluetooth and Wi-Fi) in commercially available smartphones to create peer-to-peer networks without relying on cellular carrier networks, wireless access points, or traditional network infrastructure. Wi-Fi SPANs use the mechanism behind Wi-Fi ad-hoc mode, which allows phones to talk directly among each other, through a transparent neighbor and route discovery mechanism. SPANs differ from traditional hub and spoke networks, such as Wi-Fi Direct, in that they support multi-hop routing (ad hoc routing) and relays and there is no notion of a group leader, so peers can join and leave at will without destroying the network.

SPANs are useful under circumstances when the regular network is overloaded or unavailable, such as conferences, music festivals, or natural disasters, and have been popular in Australia and Latin America. They are popular with youth in the United States as a way to save money, as data sent directly from device to device is free.

SPANs started being used in Iraq in 2014 to bypass government restrictions on Internet usage, in the 2014 and 2019–20 Hong Kong protests, in 2015 in anti-government protests in Russia. They have also been used by protestors in Taiwan, Iran, and Syria.

== Features ==
- Capable of going off-grid and enabling peer-to-peer communications without relying on cellular carrier networks, wireless access points, or traditional network infrastructure.
- Optional Internet access through gateway devices, such as mobile hotspots in the mesh.
- Optional stationary or portable infrastructures such as routers, mesh extenders, or other non-phone hardware.
- Leverage the devices that people carry on their person and use every day.
- Primarily use Bluetooth Mesh or Wi-Fi, since the cellular spectrum is licensed and controlled by cellular providers and FCC regulations.
- Set up and tear down are on-demand. Join and leave at will.
- Routing protocol may be implemented at the Network Layer or Link Layer.
- Often requires rooting a device and making modifications to the operating system, kernel, or drivers.

== Threats to telcos ==
The ad hoc networking technology operating on Wi-Fi ad hoc mode, at the unlicensed ISM band of 2.4 GHz may result in profit loss by cellular carriers since ISM band is free and unlicensed while cellular carriers operate on licensed band at 900 MHz, 1200 MHz, 1800 MHz, etc. This has the potential to threaten telecommunication operators (telcos). Smart phone mobile ad hoc networks can operate independently and allow communications among smart phones users without the need for any 3G or 4G LTE signals to be present. Wi-Fi ad hoc mode was first implemented on Lucent WaveLAN 802.11a/b on laptop computers. Since Wi-Fi is present and embedded in all smart phones today, this earlier technology was adapted for smartphones.

== Usage ==
Smartphone ad hoc networks may be useful in situations that include:

- developing nations where network infrastructure doesn't exist;
- protests where government entities monitor or disable network infrastructure;
- natural disasters or terrorist incidents where existing network infrastructure is overloaded, destroyed, or compromised;
- temporary large-scale events such as festivals where a huge scale is needed for short period of time.

=== Real-life usage of smart phone ad hoc networks ===
- 2014 – in Iraq following government restrictions on internet use, users use the technology to communicate
- 2014 – Hong Kong protests calling for more democracy used FireChat to communicate
- 2015 – Leaders of anti-government protests in Russia in December 2014 urged their followers to install FireChat
- 2015 – By 2015, millions of teenagers and school children in the United States had started using smart phone ad hoc networks to chat and communicate, without the need for Wi-Fi or cellular signals.
- 2019 – During the 2019–20 Hong Kong protests that started in opposition to a proposed modification of an extradition law, Bridgefy, a smartphone ad hoc network app apparently running on Bluetooth Mesh, was used to communicate during protests in a way that minimised tracking and interference by authorities.
- 2025 - An app using bluetooth mesh networks was downloaded heavily during the Malagasy protests.

== Operating system ==
=== Apple Multipeer Connectivity ===
In Apple Inc. iPhones released with iOS version 7.0 and higher, multipeer connectivity APIs (application programmable interfaces) are enabled and provided to allow Apple iPhones to operate in peer-to-peer ad hoc mesh networking mode. This means iPhones can now talk to each other without using a cellular signal or connection. Currently, Apple uses multipeer to allow one to send photos and large files (up to GB) to peers. This application is called AirDrop and in 2017 had started gaining in popularity. With 700+ millions of iPhones being used globally, ad hoc peer-to-peer networks will gain pervasive presence almost instantly.

=== Android phone ad hoc networks ===
By merging the Linux Wireless Extension API with parts of the Android software stack, a modified version of Android can enable the ability to harness the ad hoc routing, communications and networking features of the onboard Wi-Fi chip. This empowers millions of Android phones with ad hoc mesh connectivity and networking capabilities.

== Software implementations ==
Software packages that implement smartphone ad hoc networks include GPL-licensed Serval Project over Bluetooth or WiFi; GPL-licensed Commotion Wireless; proprietary FireChat over Bluetooth, Bridgefy over Bluetooth, and GPL-licensed Briar over Bluetooth or WiFi.

== Device manufacturer support ==
- iOS Multipeer Connectivity Framework

== See also ==
- Mobile ad hoc network
- Wireless ad hoc network
- Wireless mesh network
