= Multi-hop routing =

Type of communication in radio networks

A typical multi-hop wireless sensor network architecture

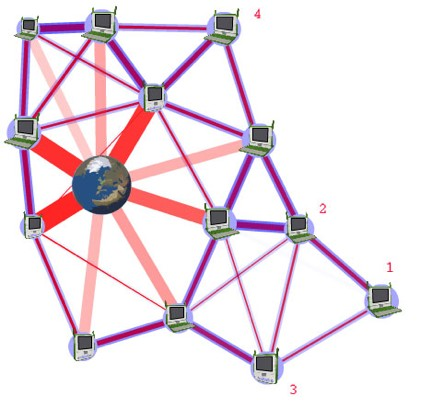
A wireless mesh network architecture allowing otherwise out-of-range nodes 1–4 to still connect to the Internet. A key characteristic is the presence of multiple-hop links and using intermediate nodes to relay packets for others.

Multi-hop routing (or multihop routing) is a type of communication in radio networks in which network coverage area is larger than radio range of single nodes. Therefore, to reach some destination a node can use other nodes as relays.

Since the transceiver is the major source of power consumption in a radio node and long-distance transmission requires high power, in some cases multi-hop routing can be more energy efficient than single-hop routing.

Typical applications of multi-hop routing:

- Wireless sensor networks
- Wireless mesh networks
- Mobile ad hoc networks
- Smart phone ad hoc networks
- Mobile networks with stationary multi-hop relays
