= Spark Alliance =

Hong Kong political organisation

- Traditional Chinese: 星火同盟抗爭支援
- Simplified Chinese: 星火同盟抗争支援
- Literal meaning: Spark Alliance resistance support
Transcriptions
Standard Mandarin
- Hanyu Pinyin: Xīnghuǒ Tóngméng kàngzhēng zhīyuán
Yue: Cantonese
- Jyutping: Sing^{1}fo^{2} Tung^{4}mang^{4} kong^{3}zang^{1} zi^{1}wun^{4}

Spark Alliance (also known as Spark Alliance HK) is an organisation which finances bail payments for persons arrested in connection with the 2019–2020 Hong Kong protests. According to donors and attorneys for the group, its leadership is unknown.

In November 2019, HSBC announced that it had given – in October of that year – a deposit account, "Prime Management Service Ltd.", 30 days to clear its funds out of the bank. The account had been used to raise funds for Spark Alliance, which HSBC said was in violation of its terms of service. The decision led to HSBC subsequently becoming a target of protesters, with several of its branches being vandalised and an online petition organised calling for the United States to block the bank from doing business in the U.S.

On 19 December 2019, the Hong Kong Police Force announced the seizure of HK$70 million in bank deposits linked to Spark Alliance and the arrest of several persons allegedly linked to Spark Alliance on charges of money laundering.
