= FireChat =

Mobile messaging app

Firechat
- Developer: Open Garden
- Stable release: Discontinued
- Platform: Android, iOS
- Type: mesh networking
- License: Proprietary
- Website: opengarden.com/firechat

FireChat was a proprietary mobile app, developed by Open Garden, which used wireless mesh networking to enable smartphones to pass messages to each other peer-to-peer via Bluetooth, Wi-Fi, or Apple's Multipeer, without an internet connection.

Though it was not designed with the purpose in mind, FireChat was used as a communication tool in some civil protests.

FireChat is now discontinued. The official URL displays a 404 error page, and apps have not been updated since 2018.

== History ==
The app was first introduced in March 2014 for iPhones, followed on April 3 by a version for Android devices.

In July 2015, FireChat introduced private messaging. Until then, it had only been possible to post messages to public chatrooms.

In May 2016, FireChat introduced FireChat Alerts, which allowed users to "push" alerts during a specific time and in a specific place. This feature was added for the benefit of aid workers doing disaster relief and stemmed from a partnership with the city of Marikina.

== Usage ==
FireChat became popular in 2014 in Iraq following government restrictions on internet use, and thereafter during the 2014 Hong Kong protests. In 2015, FireChat was also promoted by protesters during the 2015 Ecuadorian protests. On September 11, 2015, during the pro-independence demonstration called Free Way to the Catalan Republic, FireChat was used 131,000 times. In January 2016, students protested at the University of Hyderabad, India, following the suicide of a PhD student named Rohith Vemula. Some students were reported to have used Firechat after the university shut down its Wi-Fi.

== Security ==
In June 2014, Firechat's developers told Wired that "[p]eople need to understand that this is not a tool to communicate anything that would put them in a harmful situation if it were to be discovered by somebody who's hostile ... It was not meant for secure or private communications." By July 2015, the FireChat developers claimed to have added end-to-end encryption for its one-to-one private messages.

== See also ==
- Mobile ad hoc network (MANET)
- Smartphone ad hoc network
