= Bluetooth mesh networking =

Computer mesh networking standard

- Developed by: Bluetooth SIG
- Introduced: July 13, 2017
- Industry: Lighting, IoT
- 100–1000 meters (depending on mesh relaying configuration)

Bluetooth Mesh is a computer mesh networking standard based on Bluetooth Low Energy that allows for many-to-many communication over Bluetooth radio. The Bluetooth Mesh specifications were defined in the Mesh Profile and Mesh Model specifications by the Bluetooth Special Interest Group (Bluetooth SIG). Bluetooth Mesh was conceived in 2014 and adopted on July 13, 2017.

== Overview ==
Bluetooth Mesh is a mesh networking standard that operates on a flood network principle. It is based on the nodes relaying the messages: every relay node that receives a network packet that

- authenticates against a known network key
- is not in message cache
- has a TTL ≥ 2

can be retransmitted with TTL = TTL − 1. Message caching is used to prevent relaying recently seen messages.

Communication is carried in the messages that may be up to 384 bytes long, when using Segmentation and Reassembly (SAR) mechanism, but most of the messages fit in one segment, that is 11 bytes. Each message starts with an opcode, which may be a single byte (for special messages), 2 bytes (for standard messages), or 3 bytes (for vendor-specific messages).

Every message has a source and a destination address, determining which devices process messages. Devices publish messages to destinations which can be single things / groups of things / everything.

Each message has a sequence number that protects the network against replay attacks.

Each message is encrypted and authenticated. Two keys are used to secure messages: (1) network keys – allocated to a single mesh network, (2) application keys – specific for a given application functionality, e.g. turning the light on vs reconfiguring the light.

Messages have a time to live (TTL). Each time a message is received and retransmitted, TTL is decremented which limits the number of "hops", eliminating endless loops.

== Architecture ==
Bluetooth Mesh has a layered architecture, with multiple layers as below.

Layer	Functionality
Model Layer	It defines a standard way to exchange application specific messages. For example, a Light Lightness Model defines an interoperable way to control lightness. There are mandatory models, called Foundation Models, defining states and messages needed to manage a mesh network.
Access Layer	It defines a mechanism to ensure that data is transmitted and received in the right context of a model and its associated application keys.
Upper Transport Layer	It defines authenticated encryption of access layer packets using an application (or device specific key). It also defines some control messages to manage Friendship or to notify the behavior of a node using Heartbeat messages.
Lower Transport Layer	This layer defines a reliable (through a Block Acknowledgement) Segmented transmission of upper layer packets, when a complete upper layer packet can't be carried in a single network layer packet. It also defines a mechanism to reassemble segments on the receiver.
Network Layer	This layer defines how transport packets are addressed over network to one or more nodes. It defines relay functionality for forwarding messages by a relay node to extend the range. It handles the network layer authenticated encryption using network key.
Bearer Layer	It defines how the network packets are exchanged between nodes. Mesh Profile Specification defines BLE advert bearer and BLE GATT bearer. Mesh Profile defines Proxy Protocol, through which mesh packets can be exchanged via other bearers like TCP/IP.

== Types of nodes ==
Nodes that support the various features can be formed into a particular mesh network topology.

Feature	Functionality
Relay	receive and retransmit mesh messages over the advertising bearer to enable larger networks.
Proxy	receive and retransmit mesh messages between GATT and advertising bearers.
Low Power	operate within a mesh network at significantly reduced receiver duty cycles only in conjunction with a node supporting the Friend feature.
Friend	help a node supporting the Low Power feature to operate by storing messages destined for those nodes.

== Theoretical limits ==
The practical limits of Bluetooth Mesh technology are unknown. Some limits that are built into the specification include:

Limit for a network	Value	Remarks
Maximum number of nodes	32 767	The limit is 32768 addresses and while a node may occupy more than one address, the practical limit is most likely lower.
Maximum number of groups	16 384 Number of virtual groups is 2^{128}.	
Maximum number of scenes	65 535	
Maximum number of subnets	4 096	
Maximum TTL	127	

== Mesh models ==
As of version 1.0 of Bluetooth Mesh specification, the following standard models and model groups have been defined:

=== Foundation models ===
Foundation models have been defined in the core specification. Two of them are mandatory for all mesh nodes.

- Configuration Server (mandatory)
- Configuration Client
- Health Server (mandatory)
- Health Client

=== Generic models ===
- Generic OnOff Server, used to represent devices that do not fit any of the model descriptions defined but support the generic properties of On/Off
- Generic Level Server, keeping the state of an element in a 16-bit signed integer
- Generic Default Transition Time Server, used to represent a default transition time for a variety of devices
- Generic Power OnOff Server & Generic Power OnOff Setup Server, used to represent devices that do not fit any of the model descriptions but support the generic properties of On/Off
- Generic Power Level Server & Generic Power Level Setup Server, including a Generic Power Actual state, a Generic Power Last state, a Generic Power Default state and a Generic Power Range state
- Generic Battery Server, representing a set of four values representing the state of a battery
- Generic Location Server & Generic Location Setup Server, representing location information of an element, either global (Lat/Lon) or local
- Generic User/Admin/Manufacturer/Client Property Server, representing any value to be stored by an element
- Generic OnOff Client & Generic Level Client
- Generic Default Transition Time Client
- Generic Power OnOff Client & Generic Power Level Client
- Generic Battery Client
- Generic Location Client
- Generic Property Client

=== Sensors ===
- Sensor Server & Sensor Setup Server, representing a sensor device. Sensor device may be configured to return a measured value periodically or on request; measurement period (cadence) may be configured to be fixed or to change, so that more important value range is being reported faster.
- Sensor Client

=== Time and scenes ===
- Time Server & Time Setup Server, allowing for time synchronization in mesh network
- Scene Server & Scene Setup Server, allowing for up to 65535 scenes to be configured and recalled when needed.
- Scheduler Server & Scheduler Setup Server
- Time Client, Scene Client & Scheduler Client

=== Lighting ===
- Light Lightness Server & Light Lightness Setup Server, representing a dimmable light source
- Light CTL Server, Light CTL Temperature Server & Light CTL Setup Server, representing a CCT or "tunable white" light source
- Light HSL Server, Light HSL Hue Server, Light HSL Saturation Server & Light HSL Setup Server, representing a light source based on Hue, Saturation, Lightness color representation
- Light xyL Server & Light xyL Setup Server, representing a light source based on modified CIE xyY color space.
- Light LC (Lightness Control) Server & Light LC Setup Server, representing a light control device, able to control Light Lightness model using an occupancy sensor and ambient light sensor. It may be used for light control scenarios like Auto-On, Auto-Off and/or Daylight Harvesting.
- Light Lightness Client, Light CTL Client, Light HSL Client, Light xyL Client & Light LC Client

== Provisioning ==
Provisioning is a process of installing the device into a network. It is a mandatory step to build a Bluetooth Mesh network.

In the provisioning process, a provisioner securely distributes a network key and a unique address space for a device. The provisioning protocol uses P256 Elliptic Curve Diffie-Hellman Key Exchange to create a temporary key to encrypt network key and other information. This provides security from a passive eavesdropper. It also provides various authentication mechanisms to protect network information, from an active eavesdropper who uses man-in-the-middle attack, during provisioning process.

A key unique to a device known as "Device Key" is derived from elliptic curve shared secret on provisioner and device during the provisioning process. This device key is used by the provisioner to encrypt messages for that specific device.

The security of the provisioning process has been analyzed in a paper presented during the IEEE CNS 2018 conference.

The provisioning can be performed using a Bluetooth GATT connection or advertising using the specific bearer.

== Terminology used in the Bluetooth Mesh Model and Mesh Profile specifications ==
- Destination: The address to which a message is sent.
- Element: An addressable entity within a device.
- Model: Standardized operation of typical user scenarios.
- Node: A provisioned device.
- Provisioner: A node that can add a device to a mesh network.
- Relay: A node able to retransmit messages.
- Source: The address from which a message is sent.

== Implementations ==
=== Approved ("qualified") by Bluetooth SIG ===
Bluetooth mesh implementations approved ("qualified") by Bluetooth SIG
Name	Submitter	Qualification date	QDID	Type
Bluetooth Stack for Embedded Systems - MESH profile	Silvair, Inc.	July 18, 2017	98880	Profile Subsystem
Qualcomm Bluetooth Mesh	Qualcomm Technologies International, Ltd.	July 18, 2017	98856	Profile Subsystem
Silvair Mesh Models	Silvair, Inc.	July 26, 2017	99282	Profile Subsystem
Wireless Gecko Mesh Profile	Silicon Laboratories	September 21, 2017	101318	Profile Subsystem
CYW-MESH 1.0	Cypress Semiconductor Corporation	October 3, 2017	101726	Component (Tested)
Qualcomm Bluetooth Mesh Model	Qualcomm Technologies International, Ltd.	October 20, 2017	102243	Profile Subsystem
EtherMind Bluetooth Protocol Stack, 5.0 (Single Mode) + Mesh	Mindtree Limited	January 24, 2018	106544	Component (Tested)
Telink SIG Mesh SDK	Telink Semiconductor	February 1, 2018	106546	Profile Subsystem
TOSHIBA Bluetooth_stack_mesh-1	Toshiba Corporation	February 13, 2018	104143	Component (Tested)
AMICCOM Mesh Profile	AMICCOM Electronics Corporation	March 14, 2018	109370	Profile Subsystem
Amiccom Bluetooth Mesh Model	AMICCOM Electronics Corporation	March 30, 2018	110168	Profile Subsystem
Airoha SIG mesh	Airoha Technology Corp.	April 2, 2018	110202	Profile Subsystem
Marvell Mesh stack v1.0	Marvell Technology Group	April 27, 2018	110569	Component (Tested)
nRF5 SDK for Mesh	Nordic Semiconductor	May 2, 2018	111537	Profile Subsystem
Realtek Bluetooth 5 Mesh Solution	Realsil Microelectronics Inc	July 27, 2018	115668	Profile Subsystem
STSW-BNRG-Mesh	STMicroelectronics	August 2, 2018	116029	Profile Subsystem
RDA BT Host 5.0	RDA Microelectronics, Inc.	September 13, 2018	115860	Profile Subsystem
JYMC-MESH-1	Shanghai Frequen Microelectronics Co., Ltd.	October 10, 2018	119229	End Product
RW-BLE-MESH	CEVA, Inc.	October 31, 2018	119268	Component (Tested)
ARM Ltd Cordio Mesh	ARM Ltd	December 11, 2018	116593	Profile Subsystem
Samsung SLSI Bluetooth Mesh	Samsung Electronics Co., Ltd.	December 21, 2018	122442	Profile Subsystem
Bluelet Host Stack V12	Barrot Technology Limited	December 25, 2018	123056	Component (Tested)
ESP BLE Mesh v0.6	Espressif Systems (Shanghai) Pte. Ltd.	January 14, 2019	124137	Profile Subsystem
BK3435 BLE Core Spec 5.0 with MESH	Beken Corp	March 12, 2019	127926	End Product
Actions Mesh Profile Subsystem	Actions (Zhuhai) Technology Co., Limited	March 21, 2019	127646	Profile Subsystem
AliOS Things BLE host and mesh profile v2.1.0	Alibaba (China) Co., Ltd.	April 19, 2019	129750	Host Subsystem
Tonly SIG Mesh Stack	Shenzhen Tonli Science and Technology Development Co., Ltd	May 5, 2019	130160	Profile Subsystem
Sino Wealth IBLE SIG Mesh Profile	Sino Wealth Electronic Ltd.	June 18, 2019	133403	Profile Subsystem
Qualcomm Bluetooth Mesh and Mesh Model v4.0	Qualcomm Technologies International, Ltd.	June 19, 2019	128410	Profile Subsystem
PAN1020 Mesh Profile subsystem	Shanghai Panchip Microelectronics Co., Ltd	July 1, 2019	129291	Profile Subsystem
Apache NimBLE BLE Host including BLE Mesh	JUUL Labs, Inc.	July 15, 2019	131934	Component (Tested)
Tmall mesh Stack	Alibaba (China) Co., Ltd.	July 20, 2019	128246	Profile Subsystem
ClarinoxBlue	Clarinox Technologies Pty Ltd	August 2, 2019	134454	Host Subsystem
BlueX Mesh	BlueX Microelectronics Corp Ltd.	August 20, 2019	137436	Profile Subsystem
Zephyr OS Mesh	The Linux Foundation	September 20, 2019	139259	Profile Subsystem
WCH Bluetooth Mesh	Nanjing Qinheng Microelectronics Co., Ltd.	June 1, 2020	144808	Profile Subsystem

=== Free and open-source software implementations ===
Free software and open source software implementations include the following:

- The official (included in Linux kernel by Linus Torvalds in 2001) Linux Bluetooth protocol stack BlueZ, dual free-licensed under the GPL and the LGPL, supports Mesh Profile, from release version 5.47, by providing meshctl tool (deprecated) to configure mesh devices. Release version 5.53 introduced mesh-cfgclient tool for configuring mesh networks. BlueZ was approved as a "qualified" software package by Bluetooth SIG in 2005. BlueZ is not considered to be a qualified Bluetooth Mesh stack as Bluetooth Mesh is not listed in aforementioned qualification record as a supported profile.
- Apache Mynewt NimBLE, free-licensed under the Apache License 2.0, supports Bluetooth Mesh from release version 1.2.0. It was qualified on July 15, 2019 with QDID 131934.
- Zephyr OS Mesh, free-licensed under the Apache License 2.0, supports Bluetooth Mesh from release version 1.9.0. Zephyr OS Mesh 1.14.x was qualified on September 20, 2019 with QDID 139259.

== See also ==
- Cabir (computer worm)
- BlackArch
- Bluejacking
- Bluebugging
- Bluesnarfing
- AirDrop
