= IEEE 802.11s =

IEEE standard for mesh networking

IEEE 802.11s is a wireless local area network (WLAN) standard and an IEEE 802.11 amendment for mesh networking, defining how wireless devices can interconnect to create a wireless LAN mesh network, which may be used for relatively fixed (not mobile) topologies and wireless ad hoc networks. The IEEE 802.11s task group drew upon volunteers from university and industry to provide specifications and possible design solutions for wireless mesh networking. As a standard, the document was iterated and revised many times prior to finalization.

802.11 are a set of IEEE standards that govern wireless networking transmission protocols. They are commonly used today to provide wireless connectivity in the home, office and some commercial establishments.

The IEEE 802.11s standard was issued in 2011 and was superseded in 2012 when it became part of the IEEE 802.11 standard that was issued in 2012.

== Description ==
802.11s extends the IEEE 802.11 MAC standard by defining an architecture and protocol that supports both broadcast/multicast and unicast delivery using "radio-aware metrics over self-configuring multi-hop topologies."

== Closely related standards ==
802.11s inherently depends on one of 802.11a, 802.11b, 802.11g, 802.11n, 802.11ac, 802.11ah, or 802.11ax to carry the actual traffic. One or more routing protocols suitable to the actual network physical topology are required. 802.11s requires the Hybrid Wireless Mesh Protocol, or HWMP to be supported as a default. However, other mesh, ad hoc (Associativity-Based Routing, Zone Routing Protocol, and location based routing) or dynamic link-state routing (OLSR, B.A.T.M.A.N., OSPF) may be supported or even static routing (WDS). See the more detailed description below comparing these routing protocols.

A mesh often consists of many small nodes. When mobile users or heavy loads are concerned, there will often be a handoff from one base station to another, and not only from 802.11 but from other (GSM, Bluetooth, PCS and other cordless phone) networks. Accordingly, IEEE 802.21, which specifies this handoff between nodes both obeying 802.11s and otherwise, may be required. This is especially likely if a longer-range lower-bandwidth service is deployed to minimize mesh dead zones, e.g. GSM routing based on OpenBTS.

Mesh networking often involves network access by previously unknown parties, especially when a transient visitor population is being served. Thus the accompanying IEEE 802.11u standard will be required by most mesh networks to authenticate these users without pre-registration or any prior offline communication. Pre-standard captive portal approaches are also common. See the more detailed description of mesh security below.

== Timeline ==
802.11s started as a Study Group of IEEE 802.11 in September 2003. It became a Task Group in July 2004. A call for proposals was issued in May 2005, which resulted in the submission of 15 proposals submitted to a vote in July 2005. After a series of eliminations and mergers, the proposals dwindled to two (the "SEE-Mesh" and "Wi-Mesh" proposals), which became a joint proposal in January 2006. This merged proposal was accepted as draft D0.01 after a unanimous confirmation vote in March 2006.

The draft evolved through informal comment resolution until it was submitted for a Letter Ballot in November 2006 as Draft D1.00. Draft D2.00 was submitted in March 2008 which failed with only 61% approval. A year was spent clarifying and pruning until Draft D3.00 was created which reached WG approval with 79% in March 2009.

In June 2011 the fifth recirculation Sponsor Ballot, on TGs Draft 12.0, was closed. The Draft met with 97.2% approval rate.

The 2012 release of the 802.11 specification (802.11-2012) directly incorporates Mesh Routing functionality.

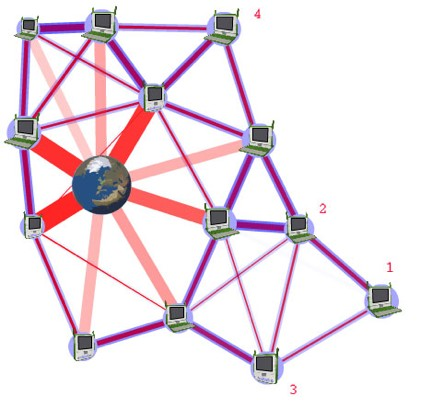
A wireless mesh network architecture allowing otherwise out-of-range nodes 1–4 to still connect to the Internet. A key characteristic is the presence of multiple-hop links and using intermediate nodes to relay packets for others.

== 802.11 mesh architecture ==
An 802.11s wireless mesh network device is labelled as Mesh Station (mesh STA), or simply an ad hoc node. Mesh STAs form mesh links with one another, over which mesh paths can be established using an ad hoc mobile routing protocol. A key aspect of this architecture is the presence of multi-hop wireless links and routing of packets through other nodes towards the destination node.

=== Routing protocols ===
802.11s defines a default mandatory routing protocol (Hybrid Wireless Mesh Protocol, or HWMP), yet allows vendors to operate using alternate routing protocols. HWMP is inspired by a combination of AODV (RFC 3561), which uses on-demand ad hoc routing approach and tree-based routing. Examples of on-demand ad hoc routing are Dynamic Source Routing and Associativity-Based Routing. AODV route discovery and localized route repair approaches are identical to Associativity-based Routing. Prior work has discussed and compared these various routing protocols in detail.

Mesh STAs are individual devices using mesh services to communicate with other devices in the network. They can also collocate with 802.11 Access Points (APs) and provide access to the mesh network to 802.11 stations (STAs), which have broad market availability. Also, mesh STAs can collocate with an 802.11 portal that implements the role of a gateway and provides access to one or more non-802.11 networks. In both cases, 802.11s provides a proxy mechanism to provide addressing support for non-mesh 802 devices, allowing for end-points to be cognizant of external addresses.

802.11s also includes mechanisms to provide deterministic network access, a framework for congestion control and power save.

=== Mesh security ===
There are no defined roles in a mesh – no clients and servers, no initiators and responders. Security protocols used in a mesh must, therefore, be true peer-to-peer protocols where either side can initiate to the other or both sides can initiate simultaneously.

==== Peer authentication methods ====
Between peers, 802.11s defines the secure password-based authentication and key establishment protocol Simultaneous Authentication of Equals (SAE). SAE is based on Diffie–Hellman key exchange using finite cyclic groups which can be a primary cyclic group or an elliptic curve. The problem with a Diffie–Hellman key exchange is that it does not have an authentication mechanism. So the resulting key is influenced by a pre-shared key and the MAC addresses of both peers to solve the authentication problem.

When peers discover each other (and security is enabled) they take part in an SAE exchange. If SAE completes successfully, each peer knows the other party possesses the mesh password and, as a by-product of the SAE exchange, the two peers establish a cryptographically strong key. This key is used with the "Authenticated Mesh Peering Exchange" (AMPE) to establish a secure peering and derive a session key to protect mesh traffic, including routing traffic.

== Implementations ==
The IEEE 802.11s amendment is supported by many products such as open80211s, OLPC. In open80211s smaller meshes of under 32 nodes are supported. Some of the projects were based on earlier (draft) versions.

- A reference implementation of the 802.11s draft is available as part of the mac80211 layer in the Linux kernel, starting with version 2.6.26. The Linux community, with its many diverse distributions, provides a heterogenous testing ground for protocols like Hybrid Wireless Mesh Protocol. OpenWrt, a Linux distribution for routers, supports mesh networking.
- In FreeBSD, the 802.11s draft is supported starting with FreeBSD 8.0.
- The Google Wifi router uses the 802.11s mesh networking protocol.
- The MeshPoint.One router uses 802.11s mesh networking protocol.

== See also ==
- Wireless mesh network
- Wireless ad hoc networks
- List of ad hoc routing protocols
- Mobile ad hoc network
