= HSLS =

HSLS refer to:

- Hazy Sighted Link State Routing Protocol, a wireless network routing algorithm
- Slovak People's Party (Slovak: Hlinkova slovenská ľudová strana)
- Croatian Social Liberal Party (Croatian: Hrvatska socijalno liberalna stranka)

== See also ==
- HSL (disambiguation)
