= Exor =

Exor may refer to:

- Exclusive or, the exclusive disjunction
- Exor, antagonist in Super Mario RPG
- ExOR, a protocol for a wireless ad-hoc networks
- Exor (company), an Italian investment holding company based in the Netherlands controlled by the Agnelli family
- EXor, a class of irregular variable stars

== See also ==
- XOR (disambiguation)
