= ZRP =

ZRP may refer to:

- Zimbabwe Republic Police
- Zone Routing Protocol in networking
- Zatlers' Reform Party, Latvia
