= CIDT =

CIDT may refer to:

- Cruel, inhuman or degrading treatment, a concept in international law and the laws of many countries
- Mobile wireless sensor network#Topology
