= LPN (disambiguation) =

LPN is a Licensed practical nurse in North America.

LPN or Lpn may also refer to:

- Lao People's Navy
- Lee Presson and the Nails, American swing band
- Lars Petter Nordhaug, Norwegian cyclist
- Learning Parity with Noise, a type of machine learning algorithm that allows for errors
- License plate number, a unique identifier for motor vehicles
- Liga Primera de Nicaragua, top division association football league in Nicaragua

== See also ==
- Longview, Portland and Northern Railway, American railroad known as LP&N
- Low-power network (disambiguation), low-power sensor networks of various topologies
