= Mobile wireless sensor network =

A mobile wireless sensor network (MWSN) can simply be defined as a wireless sensor network (WSN) in which the sensor nodes are mobile. MWSNs are a smaller, emerging field of research in contrast to their well-established predecessor. MWSNs are much more versatile than static sensor networks as they can be deployed in any scenario and cope with rapid topology changes. However, many of their applications are similar, such as environment monitoring or surveillance. Commonly, the nodes consist of a radio transceiver and a microcontroller powered by a battery, as well as some kind of sensor for detecting light, heat, humidity, temperature, etc.

== Challenges ==
Broadly speaking, there are two sets of challenges in MWSNs; hardware and environment. The main hardware constraints are limited battery power and low cost requirements. The limited power means that it's important for the nodes to be energy efficient. Price limitations often demand low complexity algorithms for simpler microcontrollers and use of only a simplex radio. The major environmental factors are the shared medium and varying topology. The shared medium dictates that channel access must be regulated in some way. This is often done using a medium access control (MAC) scheme, such as carrier-sense multiple access (CSMA), frequency-division multiple access (FDMA) or code-division multiple access (CDMA). The varying topology of the network comes from the mobility of nodes, which means that multihop paths from the sensors to the sink are not stable.

== Standards ==
Currently there is no standard for MWSNs, so often protocols from MANETs are borrowed, such as Associativity-Based Routing (AR), Ad hoc On-Demand Distance Vector Routing (AODV), Dynamic Source Routing (DSR) and Greedy Perimeter Stateless Routing (GPSR). MANET protocols are preferred as they are able to work in mobile environments, whereas WSN protocols often aren't suitable.

== Topology ==
Topology selection plays an important role in routing because the network topology decides the transmission path of the data packets to reach the proper destination. Here, all the topologies (Flat / Unstructured, cluster, tree, chain and hybrid topology) are not feasible for reliable data transmission on sensor nodes mobility. Instead of single topology, hybrid topology plays a vital role in data collection, and the performance is good. Hybrid topology management schemes include the Cluster Independent Data Collection Tree (CIDT). and the Velocity Energy-efficient and Link-aware Cluster-Tree (VELCT); both have been proposed for mobile wireless sensor networks (MWSNs).

== Routing ==
Since there is no fixed topology in these networks, one of the greatest challenges is routing data from its source to the destination. Generally these routing protocols draw inspiration from two fields; WSNs and mobile ad hoc networks (MANETs). WSN routing protocols provide the required functionality but cannot handle the high frequency of topology changes. Whereas, MANET routing protocols can deal with mobility in the network but they are designed for two way communication, which in sensor networks is often not required.

Protocols designed specifically for MWSNs are almost always multihop and sometimes adaptations of existing protocols. For example, Angle-based Dynamic Source Routing (ADSR), is an adaptation of the wireless mesh network protocol Dynamic Source Routing (DSR) for MWSNs. ADSR uses location information to work out the angle between the node intending to transmit, potential forwarding nodes and the sink. This is then used to insure that packets are always forwarded towards the sink. Also, Low Energy Adaptive Clustering Hierarchy (LEACH) protocol for WSNs has been adapted to LEACH-M (LEACH-Mobile), for MWSNs. The main issue with hierarchical protocols is that mobile nodes are prone to frequently switching between clusters, which can cause large amounts of overhead from the nodes having to regularly re-associate themselves with different cluster heads.

Another popular routing technique is to utilise location information from a GPS module attached to the nodes. This can be seen in protocols such as Zone Based Routing (ZBR), which defines clusters geographically and uses the location information to keep nodes updated with the cluster they're in. In comparison, Geographically Opportunistic Routing (GOR), is a flat protocol that divides the network area into grids and then uses the location information to opportunistically forward data as far as possible in each hop.

Multipath protocols provide a robust mechanism for routing and therefore seem like a promising direction for MWSN routing protocols. One such protocol is the query based Data Centric Braided Multipath (DCBM).

Furthermore, Robust Ad-hoc Sensor Routing (RASeR) and Location Aware Sensor Routing (LASeR) are two protocols that are designed specifically for high speed MWSN applications, such as those that incorporate UAVs. They both take advantage of multipath routing, which is facilitated by a 'blind forwarding' technique. Blind forwarding simply allows the transmitting node to broadcast a packet to its neighbors, it is then the responsibility of the receiving nodes to decide whether they should forward the packet or drop it. The decision of whether to forward a packet or not is made using a network-wide gradient metric, such that the values of the transmitting and receiving nodes are compared to determine which is closer to the sink. The key difference between RASeR and LASeR is in the way they maintain their gradient metrics; RASeR uses the regular transmission of small beacon packets, in which nodes broadcast their current gradient. Whereas, LASeR relies on taking advantage of geographical location information that is already present on the mobile sensor node, which is likely the case in many applications.

== Medium access control ==
There are three types of medium access control (MAC) techniques: based on time division, frequency division and code division. Due to the relative ease of implementation, the most common choice of MAC is time-division-based, closely related to the popular CSMA/CA MAC. The vast majority of MAC protocols that have been designed with MWSNs in mind, are adapted from existing WSN MACs and focus on low power consumption, duty-cycled schemes.

== Validation ==
Protocols designed for MWSNs are usually validated with the use of either analytical, simulation or experimental results. Detailed analytical results are mathematical in nature and can provide good approximations of protocol behaviour. Simulations can be performed using software such as OPNET, NetSim and ns2 and is the most common method of validation. Simulations can provide close approximations to the real behaviour of a protocol under various scenarios. Physical experiments are the most expensive to perform and, unlike the other two methods, no assumptions need to be made. This makes them the most reliable form of information, when determining how a protocol will perform under certain conditions.

== Applications ==
The advantage of allowing the sensors to be mobile increases the number of applications beyond those for which static WSNs are used. Sensors can be attached to a number of platforms:

- People
- Animals
- Autonomous Vehicles
- Unmanned Vehicles
- Manned Vehicles

In order to characterise the requirements of an application, it can be categorised as either constant monitoring, event monitoring, constant mapping or event mapping. Constant type applications are time-based and as such data is generated periodically, whereas event type applications are event drive and so data is only generated when an event occurs. The monitoring applications are constantly running over a period of time, whereas mapping applications are usually deployed once in order to assess the current state of a phenomenon. Examples of applications include health monitoring, which may include heart rate, blood pressure etc. This can be constant, in the case of a patient in a hospital, or event driven in the case of a wearable sensor that automatically reports your location to an ambulance team in the case of an emergency. Animals can have sensors attached to them in order to track their movements for migration patterns, feeding habits or other research purposes. Sensors may also be attached to unmanned aerial vehicles (UAVs) for surveillance or environment mapping. In the case of autonomous UAV aided search and rescue, this would be considered an event mapping application, since the UAVs are deployed to search an area but will only transmit data back when a person has been found.

== See also ==
- List of ad hoc routing protocols
- List of sensors
- Cyber-physical system
- Mobile ad hoc networks
- Mobile robot and Mobile manipulator
- Wireless sensor networks
