= Elizabeth Belding =

Computer scientist

- Education: Florida State University; University of California, Santa Barbara
- Awards: IEEE Fellow, ACM Fellow
- Scientific career
- Fields: Mobile computing and wireless networks
- Workplaces: University of California, Santa Barbara.
- Thesis: (2000)

Elizabeth Michelle Belding is a computer scientist specializing in mobile computing and wireless networks. She is a professor of computer science at the University of California, Santa Barbara.

== Education and career ==
Belding graduated from Florida State University in 1996 with two degrees: one in computer science and a second in applied mathematics. Both degrees were Summa Cum Laude with Honors. She went to the University of California, Santa Barbara on a National Science Foundation Graduate Fellowship, and completed her Ph.D. in electrical and computer engineering in 2000. Her dissertation, under the name Elizabeth Michelle Royer, was Routing in Ad hoc Mobile Networks: On-Demand and Hierarchical Strategies, and was jointly supervised by P. Michael Melliar-Smith and Louise Moser.

She has been a member of the computer science faculty at the University of California, Santa Barbara since 2000.

== Recognition ==
Belding was named Fellow of the Institute of Electrical and Electronics Engineers (IEEE) in 2014 for "contributions to mobile and wireless networking and communication protocols". She was elected as an ACM Fellow in 2018 for "contributions to communication in mobile networks and their deployment in developing regions".

One of her publications, on Ad hoc On-Demand Distance Vector Routing in mobile networks, was selected for the SIGMOBILE Test of Time Award in 2018.
