= MMARP =

The Multicast MAnet Routing Protocol (MMARP) aims to provide multicast routing in Mobile Ad Hoc Networks (MANETs) taking into account interoperation with fixed IP networks with support of IGMP/MLD protocol. This is achieved by the Multicast Internet Gateway (MIG) which is an ad hoc node itself and is responsible for notifying access routers about the interest revealed by common ad hoc nodes. Any of these nodes may become a MIG at any time but needs to be one hop away from the network access router. Once it self-configures as MIG it should then broadcast periodically its address as being that of the default multicast gateway. Whoever besides this proactive advertisement the protocol states a reactive component the ad hoc mesh is created and maintained.

When a source node has multicast traffic to send it broadcast a message warning potential receivers of such data. Receivers should then manifest interest sending a Join message towards the source creating a multicast shortest path. Also in the same way the MIG should inform all the ad hoc nodes about the path towards multicast sources in the fixed network.

== See also ==
- List of ad hoc routing protocols
