= DSRFLOW =

DSRFLOW, the Flow-State extensions to Dynamic Source Routing (DSR), are a set of extensions that provide all of the benefits of source routing, without most of the per-packet overhead that is associated with source routing. It works by allowing most packets to be sent without a source route header, thus substantially reducing overhead. Indeed, one of the disadvantages of DSR was that the longer the source route of the packet was, the bigger the packet header became. The technique used is called implicit source routing. Flow state extensions to DSR were first described in "Implicit Source Routes for On-Demand Ad Hoc Network Routing" by Yih-Chun Hu and David B. Johnson (2001).

The implicit source routing mechanism is now included in the DSR Internet Draft.

The main idea of DSRFLOW is to introduce a so-called flow table for each network node and thus making DSRFLOW a stateful routing protocol. For each flow a node forwards there is one entry in the flow table which minimally must record the next hop address.
