= CBRP =

Routing protocol for wireless mesh networks

CBRP, or Cluster Based Routing Protocol, is a routing protocol for wireless mesh networks. CBRP was originally designed in mid 1998 by the National University of Singapore and subsequently published as an Internet Draft in August 1998. CBRP is one of the earlier hierarchical ad-hoc routing protocols. In CBRP, nodes dynamically form clusters to maintain structural routing support and to minimize excessive discovery traffic typical for ad-hoc routing.

Many performance studies on CBRP have been conducted in the area of Vehicular Ad-Hoc Network (VANET). CBRP is shown to perform moderately well in large and high density mesh networks

== See also ==
- Wireless ad hoc networks
- Mesh networking
- List of Ad Hoc Routing Protocols
