= Low-power network =

Low-power network (LPN) or wireless low-power network may refer to:

- Low-power personal-area network (LPPAN), a low-power wireless sensor/actuator PAN
- Low-power wide-area network (LPWAN), a low-power wireless sensor/actuator WAN

== See also ==
- Wireless sensor network (WSN)
- Mobile wireless sensor network (MWSN)
