= XOR (disambiguation) =

XOR (exclusive or) is a logical operator whose negation is the logical biconditional.

XOR may also refer to:

- XOR cipher, an encryption algorithm
- XOR gate, a digital logic gate
- bitwise XOR, an operator used in computer programming
- XOR (video game), a 1987 puzzle video game
- XOR, an x200 instruction
- Xor DDoS, a Linux Trojan malware
- XOR Corporation, a video game publisher and developer
- XOR, a character from Ultimate Custom Night

== See also ==
- Xors, a Slavic god
- Exor (disambiguation)
- OR (disambiguation)
