= Gordon Foster =

Irish creator of ISBN code

F. Gordon Foster
- Born: 24 February 1921; Belfast, United Kingdom
- Died: 20 December 2010 (aged 89); Dublin, Ireland
- Known for: Foster's theorem
- Scientific career
- Doctoral advisor: David George Kendall

Frederic Gordon Foster (24 February 1921 – 20 December 2010) was a British computational engineer, statistician, professor, and college dean who is widely known for devising, in 1965, a nine-digit code upon which the International Standard Book Number (ISBN) is based.

== Life ==
Foster was born in Belfast, United Kingdom of Great Britain and Ireland, between the 1920 enactment and 1921 implementation of the partition of Ireland. He studied at the Royal Belfast Academical Institution and began advanced study in mathematics at Queen's University Belfast. During World War II, he was recruited from Queen's to work as a code-breaker at Bletchley Park.

After the war, he resumed studies at Magdalen College, Oxford. A lecture on feedback control by Norbert Wiener, regarded as the originator of cybernetics, proved to be a great influence on Foster's research. Upon completing his PhD at Magdalen, he accepted an offer to lecture on his research at the University of Manchester, where he met Alan Turing, a Bletchley Park veteran who became known as the father of computer science. Turing introduced him to the Manchester Mark I computer and enlisted his help working on it. In 1956 Foster joined the faculty of the London School of Economics (LSE), first as an assistant lecturer in statistics, then as a lecturer and reader. In 1964 he was appointed to the chair of computational methods. While at LSE, he helped develop operations research as an academic discipline.

In 1965, while at the LSE, Foster was commissioned by WH Smith, the book publisher and bookseller, to develop a computerised filing system as part of its drive to modernise its growing company. Foster developed a 9 digit code which he named the Standard Book Numbering System (SBN). This code was very successful and was rapidly adopted by all UK publishers and booksellers. In 1970 the International Standard Organisation (ISO) expanded the SBN to 10 digits by adding an initial zero and the code was renamed to become the International Book Numbering System, or ISBN. It is now used worldwide by all publishers and booksellers.

In 1967 Foster was asked by Trinity College Dublin to start a Department of Statistics, and became its professor of statistics. He promoted statistical analysis and computer applications in several constituent schools and academic departments. He fostered a lively forward thinking postgraduate and undergraduate program, with courses highly applicable to the current statistical problems of the day. He also set up the Statistics and Operations Research Laboratory, known for outreach to industry and public services. He was elected a fellow of Trinity College Dublin in 1971 and Dean of Engineering and System Sciences.

Foster died in Dublin on 20 December 2010.
