= HSL (disambiguation) =

HSL may refer to:

== Science, technology and computing ==
- HSL (Fortran library), a numerical software library
- HSL and HSV color space
- Health and Safety Laboratory, UK
- Hormone-sensitive lipase, a protein
- Hybrid solar lighting

== Transport ==
- Bell HSL, a 1950s U.S. Navy antisubmarine helicopter
- Haslemere railway station in England
- Helsinki Regional Transport Authority (Helsingin seudun liikenne), in Finland
- High-speed launch, a type of military boat typically used for air-sea rescue operations
- Hindustan Shipyard, in Visakhapatnam, Andhra Pradesh, India
- Hispania Líneas Aéreas, a defunct Spanish airline
- HSL Logistik, a German train operator
- Huslia Airport, in Alaska, US
- High-speed rail lines in Benelux HSL 1, HSL 2 HSL 3 HSL 4, and HSL-Zuid
- HSL-34 to HSL-94: Former US Navy helicopter Anti-submarine (Light) squadrons

== Other uses ==
- Hausa Sign Language, Kano, Nigeria
- Hawaiʻi Sign Language, Hawaii, United States
- Hamburg School of Logistics, now Kühne Logistics University, Germany
- Staff Selection Commission Combined Higher Secondary Level Exam or CHSL/HSL, civil service examination by the Staff Selection Commission for governmental posts in India
