= VELCT =

Velocity Energy-efficient and Link-aware Cluster-Tree (VELCT) is a cluster and tree-based topology management protocol for mobile wireless sensor networks (MWSNs).

== See also ==
- DCN
- DCT
- CIDT
