= Zone Routing Protocol =

Zone Routing Protocol, or ZRP is a hybrid wireless networking routing protocol that uses both proactive and reactive routing protocols when sending information over the network. ZRP was designed to speed up delivery and reduce processing overhead by selecting the most efficient type of protocol to use throughout the route.

== How ZRP works ==
If a packet's destination is in the same zone as the origin, the proactive protocol using an already stored routing table is used to deliver the packet immediately.

If the route extends outside the packet's originating zone, a reactive protocol takes over to check each successive zone in the route to see whether the destination is inside that zone. This reduces the processing overhead for those routes. Once a zone is confirmed as containing the destination node, the proactive protocol, or stored route-listing table, is used to deliver the packet.

In this way packets with destinations within the same zone as the originating zone are delivered immediately using a stored routing table. Packets delivered to nodes outside the sending zone avoid the overhead of checking routing tables along the way by using the reactive protocol to check whether each zone encountered contains the destination node.

Thus ZRP reduces the control overhead for longer routes that would be necessary if using proactive routing protocols throughout the entire route, while eliminating the delays for routing within a zone that would be caused by the route-discovery processes of reactive routing protocols.

== Details ==
What is called the Intra-zone Routing Protocol (IARP), or a proactive routing protocol, is used inside routing zones. What is called the Inter-zone Routing Protocol (IERP), or a reactive routing protocol, is used between routing zones. IARP uses a routing table. Since this table is already stored, this is considered a proactive protocol. IERP uses a reactive protocol.

Any route to a destination that is within the same local zone is quickly established from the source's proactively cached routing table by IARP. Therefore, if the source and destination of a packet are in the same zone, the packet can be delivered immediately.

Most existing proactive routing algorithms can be used as the IARP for ZRP.

In ZRP a zone is defined around each node, called the node's k-neighborhood, which consists of all nodes within k hops of the node. Border nodes are nodes which are exactly k hops away from a source node.

For routes beyond the local zone, route discovery happens reactively. The source node sends a route request to the border nodes of its zone, containing its own address, the destination address and a unique sequence number. Each border node checks its local zone for the destination. If the destination is not a member of this local zone, the border node adds its own address to the route request packet and forwards the packet to its own border nodes. If the destination is a member of the local zone, it sends a route reply on the reverse path back to the source. The source node uses the path saved in the route reply packet to send data packets to the destination.
