= Dynamic Source Routing =

Routing protocol for wireless mesh networks

Dynamic source routing (DSR) is a routing protocol for wireless mesh networks. It is similar to AODV in that it forms a route on-demand when a transmitting node requests one. However, it uses source routing instead of relying on the routing table at each intermediate device.

Usually, in environments where infrastructure like routers and access points are absent, DSR enables efficient data packet routing by relying on the cooperation of individual nodes to relay messages to the intended destinations. This protocol plays a crucial role in mobile ad hoc networks (MANETs), where network topology can frequently change due to node mobility, leading to the need for adaptive, efficient routing.

== Background ==
Determining the source route requires accumulating the address of each device between the source and destination during route discovery. The accumulated path information is cached by nodes processing the route discovery packets. The learned paths are used to route packets. To accomplish source routing, the routed packets contain the address of each device the packet will traverse. This may result in high overhead for long paths or large addresses, like IPv6. To avoid using source routing, DSR optionally defines a flow id option that allows packets to be forwarded on a hop-by-hop basis.

This protocol is truly based on source routing whereby all the routing information is maintained (continually updated) at mobile nodes. It has only two major phases, which are Route Discovery and Route Maintenance. Route Reply would only be generated if the message has reached the intended destination node (route record which is initially contained in Route Request would be inserted into the Route Reply).

To return the Route Reply, the destination node must have a route to the source node. If the route is in the Destination Node's route cache, the route would be used. Otherwise, the node will reverse the route based on the route record in the Route Request message header (this requires that all links are symmetric). In the event of fatal transmission, the Route Maintenance Phase is initiated whereby the Route Error packets are generated at a node. The erroneous hop will be removed from the node's route cache; all routes containing the hop are truncated at that point. Again, the Route Discovery Phase is initiated to determine the most viable route.

For information on other similar protocols, see the list of ad hoc routing protocols.

=== Restricting bandwidth ===
Dynamic source routing protocol (DSR) is an on-demand protocol designed to restrict the bandwidth consumed by control packets in ad hoc wireless networks by eliminating the periodic table-update messages required in the table-driven approach. The major difference between this and the other on-demand routing protocols is that it is beacon-less and hence does not require periodic hello packet (beacon) transmissions, which are used by a node to inform its neighbors of its presence. The basic approach of this protocol (and all other on-demand routing protocols) during the route construction phase is to establish a route by flooding Route Request packets in the network. The destination node, on receiving a Route Request packet, responds by sending a Route Reply packet back to the source, which carries the route traversed by the Route Request packet received.

Consider a source node that does not have a route to the destination. When it has data packets to be sent to that destination, it initiates a RouteRequest packet. This Route Request is flooded throughout the network. Each node, upon receiving a Route Request packet, rebroadcasts the packet to its neighbors if it has not forwarded it already, provided that the node is not the destination node and that the packet's time to live (TTL) counter has not been exceeded.

Each Route Request carries a sequence number generated by the source node and the path it has traversed. A node, upon receiving a Route Request packet, checks the sequence number on the packet before forwarding it. The packet is forwarded only if it is not a duplicate Route Request. The sequence number on the packet is used to prevent loop formations and to avoid multiple transmissions of the same Route Request by an intermediate node that receives it through multiple paths.

Thus, all nodes except the destination forward a Route Request packet during the route construction phase. A destination node, after receiving the first Route Request packet, replies to the source node through the reverse path the Route Request packet had traversed. Nodes can also learn about the neighboring routes traversed by data packets if operated in the promiscuous mode (the mode of operation in which a node can receive the packets that are neither broadcast nor addressed to itself). This route cache is also used during the route construction phase.

== Advantages and disadvantages ==
=== Advantages ===
This protocol uses a reactive approach which eliminates the need to periodically flood the network with table update messages which are required in a table-driven approach. In a reactive (on-demand) approach such as this, a route is established only when it is required and hence the need to find routes to all other nodes in the network as required by the table-driven approach is eliminated. The intermediate nodes also utilize the route cache information efficiently to reduce the control overhead.

=== Disadvantages ===
The disadvantage of this protocol is that the route maintenance mechanism does not locally repair a broken link. Stale route cache information could also result in inconsistencies during the route reconstruction phase. The connection setup delay is higher than in table-driven protocols. Even though the protocol performs well in static and low-mobility environments, the performance degrades rapidly with increasing mobility. Also, considerable routing overhead is involved due to the source-routing mechanism employed in DSR. This routing overhead is directly proportional to the path length.

== See also ==
- DSRFLOW
