= Ertuğ =

Ertuğ is a Turkish surname and male given name. It may refer to:

- Ahmet Ertuğ (born 1949), Turkish photographer
- Ertuğ Ergin (1970–2012), Turkish musician
- Ismail Ertug (born 1975), German politician
- Osman Ertuğ (born 1949), Northern Cypriot diplomat

== See also ==
- Ertuğrul (disambiguation)
