= Google WiFi =

Municipal wireless network deployed in Mountain View, California

Google WiFi was a municipal wireless network deployed in Mountain View, California. It was funded by Google and installed primarily on city lightposts. Google had committed to keeping the service free until 2010. The initial service was shut down by Google on May 3, 2014 at their Mountain View base, and provided a new public outdoor WiFi.

== Wireless access ==
As of 2009, Google used over 500 Tropos Networks MetroMesh routers acting as access points mounted primarily on utility poles providing usable signal and broadband internet access to over 95% of the city's area of 12 square miles (31 km^{2}). As of 2009, it serves over 16,000 unique users each month and handles over 500 gigabytes of data in 24 hours. There are three aggregation points (or base stations) that all traffic is forwarded to. The radios in the access points offer both GoogleWiFi (which has no encryption) and GoogleWiFiSecure (which uses WPA to encrypt the over-the-air traffic) service set identifiers (SSID). Google WiFi only requires its end users have a Google Account. Google offers a free virtual private network (VPN) software client called Google Secure Access (GSA) and maintains a list of other recommended third-party VPN software packages. Unlike a residential gateway, the network does not use network address translation (NAT): it provides a routable IP Address from a DHCP pool with a one-hour "DHCP lease" under the DNS domain wifi.google.com directly to the client PC. A mobile laptop user can roam through Mountain View and maintain the same IP address for at least the one-hour lease time.

While the equipment is of high quality and well-placed, actual coverage with a laptop with built-in Wi-Fi hardware is less than 100% of the claimed area; the system works well in commercially zoned areas but residential coverage areas are still spotty from block to block. There are areas in the city which do not have city owned light poles and thus do not have routers.

== Rollout ==
The service was announced by Google on September 20, 2005 and the service went live on August 16, 2006. Google WiFi was available throughout most of Mountain View.

== Network decline ==
Around the summer of 2012, the network declined significantly. Users in some neighborhoods could not get connections, and the connections that were obtained in other areas had problems. Mountain View stated, "The city has received many complaints in recent months regarding the performance and reliability of the free Google Wi-Fi system in Mountain View, particularly at our library."

Computerworld reported that "An August field test by IDG News Service found it impossible to get a working connection at numerous points around the city, including City Hall and the main library." Users at the library do not use the Google WiFi connection but rather the wired Ethernet connections that the library makes available at many tables.

The city does not know what is wrong with the network except that it does not work. Google believes that video streaming on the network saturates its capacity. An article describes the network's decline.

== Partnership with Starbucks ==
During the summer of 2013, Starbucks began replacing AT&T with Google Wi-Fi in its 7,000 locations in the United States. As of May 2015, the switch to Google is incomplete in many stores including most stores in major cities.

== Wi-Fi pylons in New York ==
In 2015 Google planned to turn 10,000 of New York City's old phone booths into ad-supported "Wi-Fi pylons". These converted booths could also provide phone charging, free domestic phone calls and information hub about the city.

== See also ==
- LinkNYC
