= PanOULU =

panOULU is a municipal wireless network in Finland. panOULU is operated by City of Oulu, University of Oulu, Oulu University of Applied Sciences and Oulun Puhelin Oyj. The network coveres central Oulu (including various buildings, such as the city hall, public libraries, Oulun Energia Areena ice hockey arena, etc.), and the campus areas. In addition, outside of Oulu, the network covers Oulu Airport in Oulunsalo, the ferries to Hailuoto, University of Oulu campus in Kajaani, and the Chydenius Institute campus in Kokkola. The network also covers parts of Ylikiiminki. The network is free to use and requires no passwords; it can be used with any computer, cell phone, PDA or other device that is capable of using Wi-Fi.

As of 2007 the network has over 900 wireless access points. Based on coverage and potential number of users, it is currently the largest public wireless network in Finland. Also, it is the first free and open wireless network that operates in an airport in Finland.
