= Municipal wireless network =

Wi-fi network provided by local government

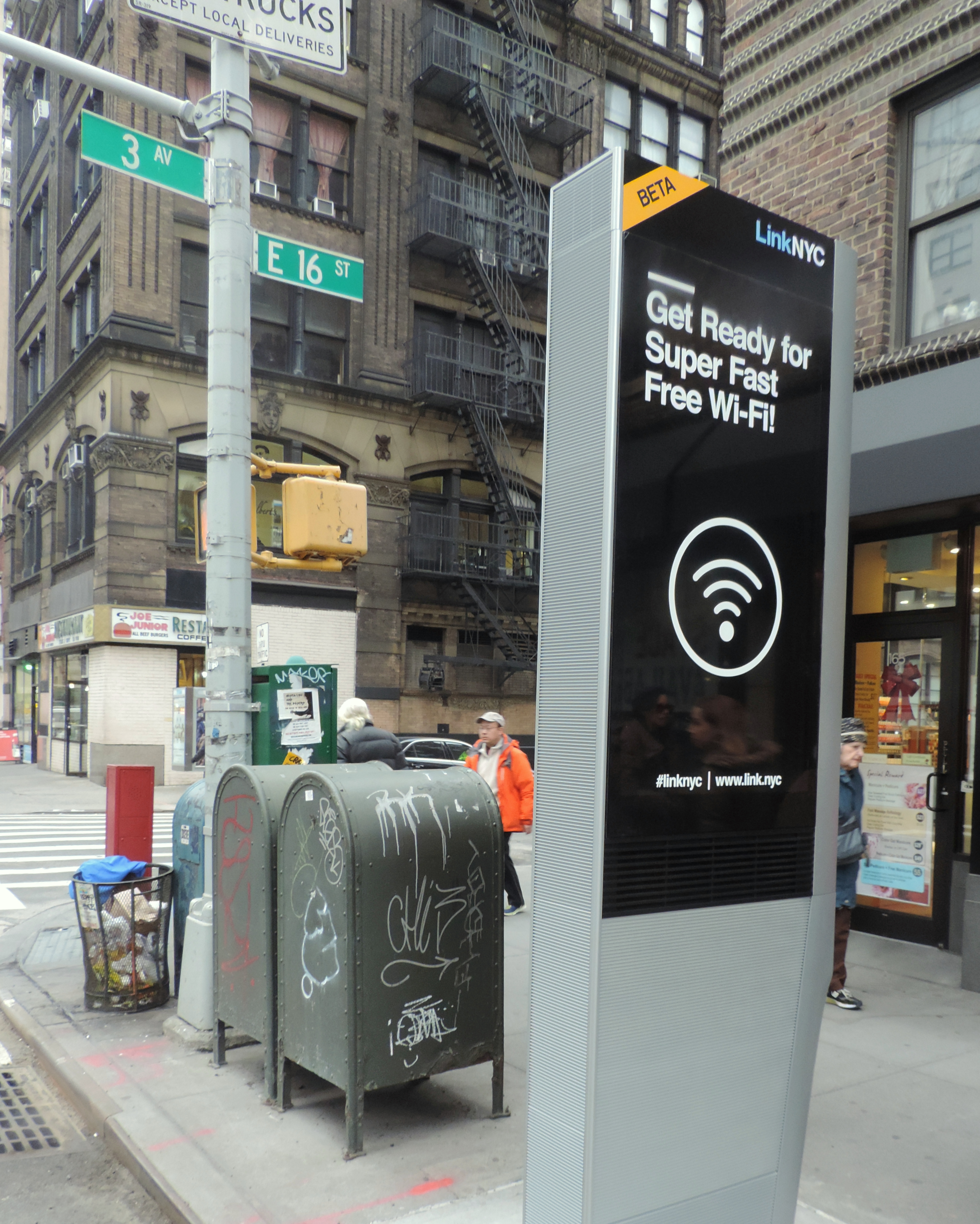
LinkNYC was announced by New York City Mayor Bill de Blasio in 2014 and will eventually replace the city's network of payphones.

A municipal wireless network is a citywide wireless network. This usually works by providing municipal broadband via Wi-Fi to large parts or all of a municipal area by deploying a wireless mesh network. The typical deployment design uses hundreds of wireless access points deployed outdoors, often on poles. The operator of the network acts as a wireless internet service provider.

== Overview ==
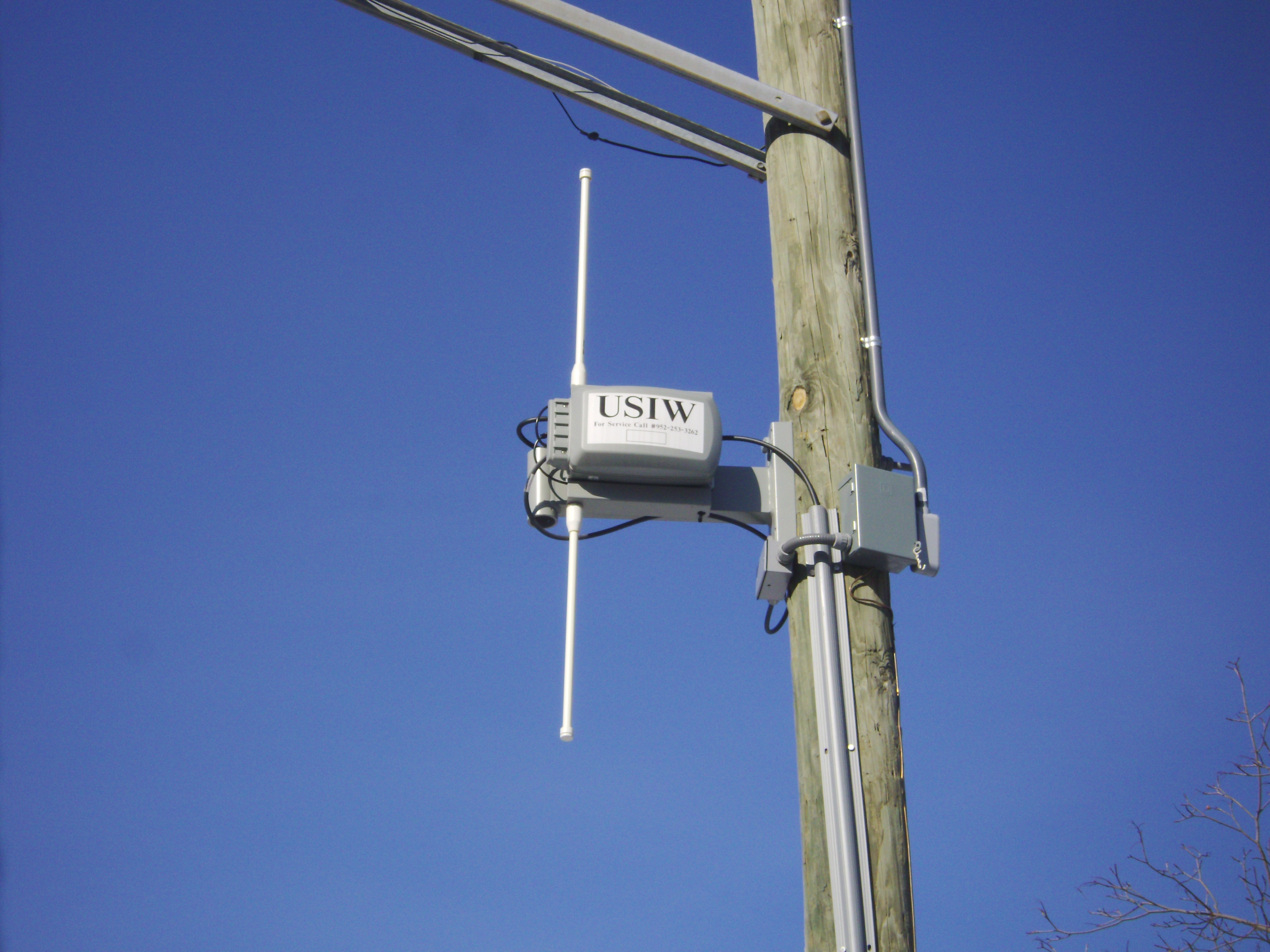
A municipal Wi-Fi antenna in Minneapolis, Minnesota

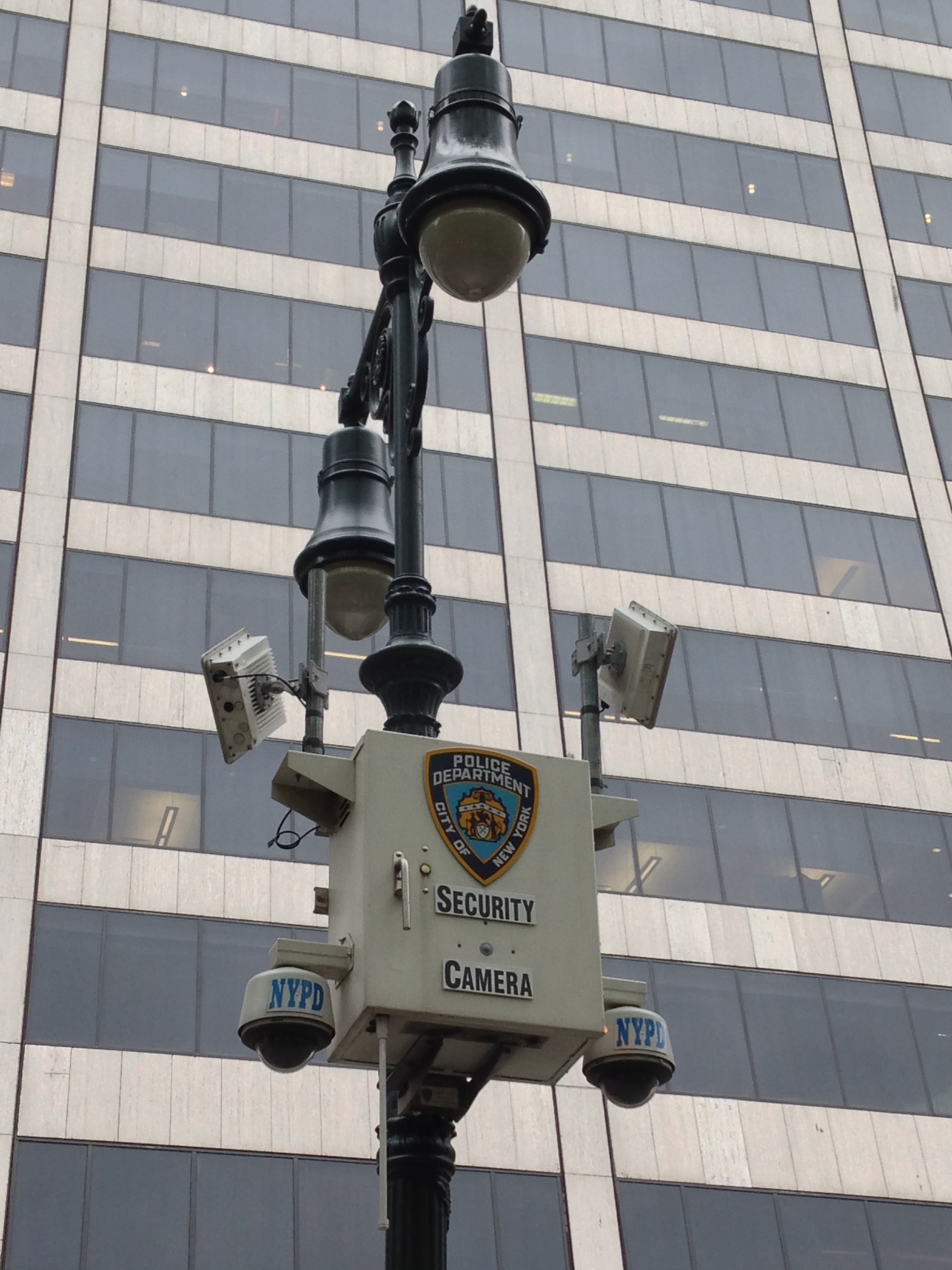
Wireless security cameras on a lamp post deployed by New York City Police Department. They are connected to the municipal NYC Wireless Network (NYCWiN).

Municipal wireless networks go far beyond the existing piggybacking opportunities available near public libraries and some coffee shops. The basic premise of carpeting an area with wireless service in urban centers is that it is more economical to the community to provide the service as a utility rather than to have individual households and businesses pay private firms for such a service. Such networks are capable of enhancing city management and public safety, especially when used directly by city employees in the field. They can also be a social service to those who cannot afford private high-speed services. When the network service is free and a small number of clients consume a majority of the available capacity, operating and regulating the network might prove difficult.

In 2003, Verge Wireless formed an agreement with Tropos Networks to build a municipal wireless networks in the downtown area of Baton Rouge, Louisiana. Carlo MacDonald, the founder of Verge Wireless, suggested that it could provide cities a way to improve economic development and developers to build mobile applications that can make use of faster bandwidth. Verge Wireless built networks for Baton Rouge, New Orleans, and other areas. Some applications include wireless security cameras, police mug shot software, and location-based advertising.

In 2007, some companies with existing cell sites offered high-speed wireless services where the laptop owner purchased a PC card or adapter based on EV-DO cellular data receivers or WiMAX rather than 802.11b/g. A few high-end laptops at that time featured built-in support for these newer protocols. WiMAX is designed to implement a metropolitan area network (MAN) while 802.11 is designed to implement a wireless local area network (LAN). However, the use of cellular networks is expensive for the consumers, as they are often on limited data plans.

In the 2010s larger cities embraced the smart city concept to tackle problems such as traffic congestion, crime, encouraging economic growth, responding to the effects of climate change and improving the delivery of city services. However, by 2018 it has become clear that the private sector could not be relied upon to build up city-wide wireless networks to meet the smart city objectives of municipal governments and public utility providers.

== Finance ==
The construction of municipal wireless networks is a significant part of their lifetime costs. Usually, a private firm works with local government to construct a network and operate it. Financing is usually shared by both the private firm and the municipal government. Once operational, the service may be free to users via public finance or advertising, or may be a paid service. Among deployed networks, usage as measured by number of distinct users has been shown to be moderate to light. Private firms serving multiple cities sometimes maintain an account for each user, and allow the user a limited amount of mobile service in the cities covered. As of 2007 some Muni WiFi deployments are delayed as the private and public partners negotiate the business model and financing.

== Corporate city-wide wireless networks ==
Google WiFi is entirely funded by Google. Despite a failed attempt to provide citywide WiFi through a partnership with internet service provider Earthlink in 2007, the company claims that they are working to provide a wireless network for the city of San Francisco, California, although there is no specified completion date. Some other projects that are still in the planning stages have pared back their planned coverage from 100% of a municipal area to only densely commercially zoned areas. One of the most ambitious planned projects is to provide wireless service throughout Silicon Valley, but the winner of the bid seems ready to request that the 40 cities involved help cover more of the cost, which has raised concerns that the project will ultimately be too slow to market to be a success. Advances in technology in 2005–2007 may allow wireless community network projects to offer a viable alternative. Such projects have an advantage in that, as they do not have to negotiate with government entities, they have no contractual obligations for coverage. A promising example is Meraki's demonstration in San Francisco, which already claims 20,000 distinct users as of October 2007.

In 2009, Microsoft and Yahoo also provided free wireless to select regions in the United States. Yahoo's free WiFi was made available for one year to the Times Square area in New York City beginning November 10, 2009. Microsoft made free WiFi available to select airports and hotels across the United States, in exchange for one search on the Bing search engine by the user.

The City of Adelaide in South Australia in collaboration with the South Australian Government operate a meshed network "Adelaide Free WIFI. For the past five years the network attracts some 8,000 daily users as the networks popularity continues to grow despite the proliferation of 4G technology.

== Criticism and externalities ==
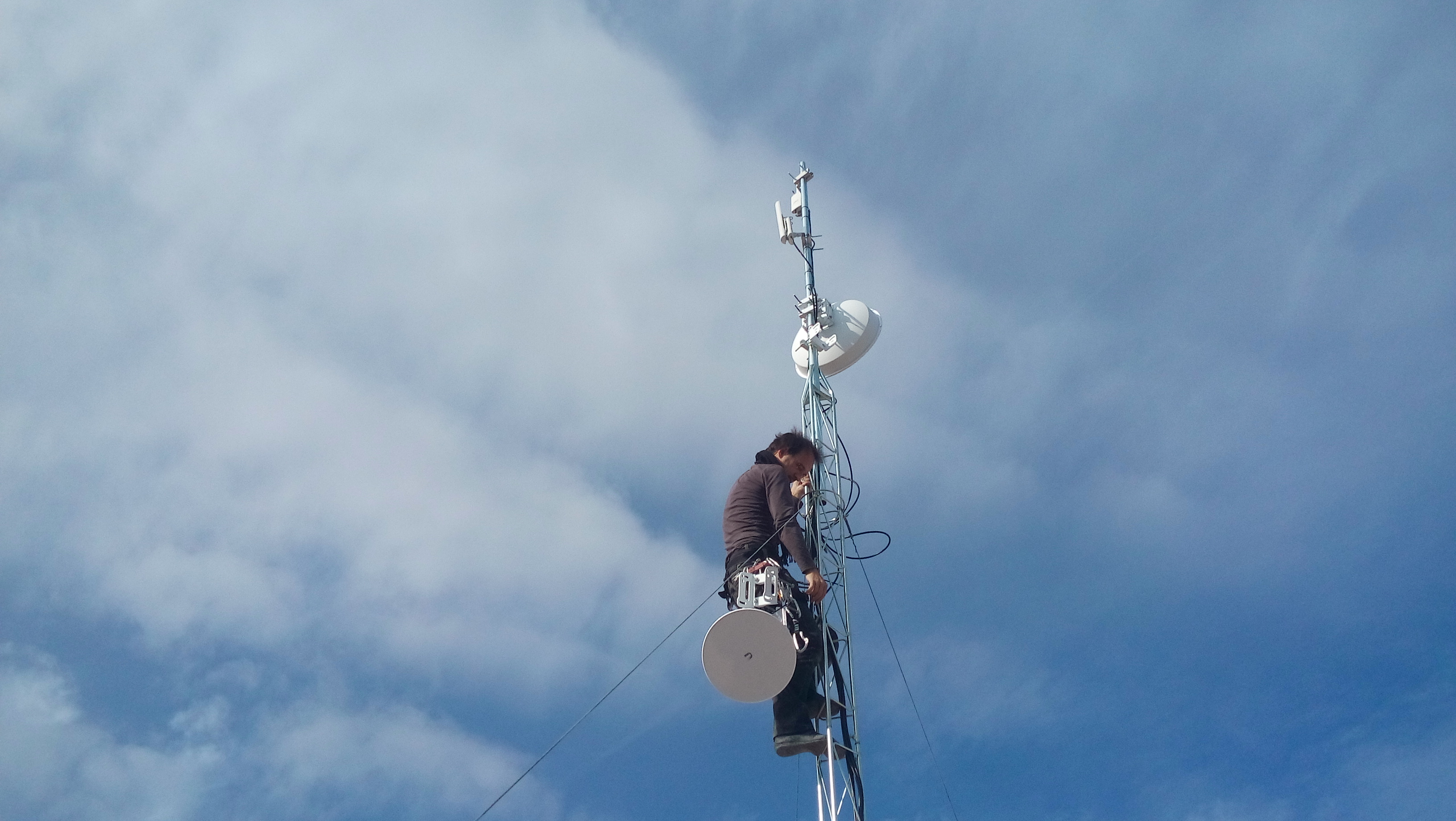
A volunteer installing a "supernode" of guifi.net. In July 2018 guifi.net had over 35,000 active nodes and about 63,000 km of wireless links.

Municipal wireless networks face opposition from telecommunications providers, particularly in the United States, South Africa, India and the European Union. In the 2000s telecommunications providers argued that it is neither economical nor legal for municipal governments to own or operate such businesses. The dominant type of wireless networks are the private wireless local area networks (WLANs), for which individuals or businesses pay a subscription to a local carrier. In 2006 the US Federal Trade Commission expressed concerns about such private-public partnerships as trending towards a franchise monopoly. Within the United States, providing a municipal wireless network was not recognized as a priority. Some have argued that the benefits of public approach may exceed the costs, similar to cable television.

In the early 2010s concerns were articulated that a considerable percentage of the world population did not have access to affordable Internet access. Despite the growing digitalization of business and government services, 37 percent of the European and 22 percent of the North American population did not have affordable access to the Internet in 2009. Because local governments and municipalities in rural economiess either could not fund wireless networks or did not consider it a priority, numerous communities across the world have built and funded autonomous community wireless networks (CWNs), taking advantage of the free 2.4 GHz spectrum and open source software.

The former New York state politician and lobbyist Thomas M. Reynolds argues that unintended externalities are possible as a result of local governments providing Internet service to their constituents. A private service provider could choose to offer limited or no service to a region if that region's largest city opted to provide free Internet service, thus eliminating the potential customer base. The private sector receives no money from taxpayers, so there isn't competition. The lack of competition prevents other municipalities in that region from benefiting from the services of the private provider. The smaller public municipalities would at the same time not benefit from the free service provided by the larger city because it is designed to be subsidized by taxpayers and not concerned about the maximization of profits. The broadband provided by the government isn't largely supported to create an income on top of the private sector not being competed with enough to make a profit. Thus, making both municipal wireless networks anticompetitive.

== Cities with municipal wireless service ==
In many cases several points or areas are covered, without blanket area coverage.

=== Africa ===
- Gaborone, Botswana - rolling out free Wi-Fi to the whole city.
- Francistown also the city of Botswana has the same initiative.
- Luxor, Egypt - pilot, paid service in tourist areas
- Sharm el-Sheikh, Egypt - pilot, paid service, tourist areas, EgyNet
- Johannesburg - City of Johannesburg is currently rolling out free Wi-Fi to many suburbs as well as the city center.
- Pretoria - South Africa the City of Tswhane has offered its free Wi-Fi to residents around the City, TshWi-Fi
- Mombasa, Kenya

=== East Asia ===
==== China ====
Free public WiFi in tourist areas of big cities, railway stations, airports, and governmental facilities in Shanghai, Beijing, Tianjin, Harbin, Shenyang, Shenzhen, Kunming, Hangzhou, Suzhou, Wuxi, Nanjing, Xi'an, Chengdu, Chongqing, Fuzhou, Ningbo, Foshan, Dalian, Changchun, Qingdao, Yantai, Dongguan, Macau, Huangshan, Hefei, Guiyang, and Guangzhou

- Hong Kong - most are subscribed, paid services, but free service in selected governmental facilities is also available
- Shanghai - city network in tourist areas, governmental facilities, and the districts of Jiading, Minhang, Pudong, Songjiang, Baoshan, and Puxi are covered. Public WiFi in various shopping malls, restaurants, stores, along with Pudong Airport, Hongqiao Airport, and all railway stations.
- Beijing - Citywide network covers most districts, including downtown, along with public WiFi by stores, shopping malls, and restaurants, along with Government Facilities, transportation centers, and Beijing Capital International Airport.
- Tianjin - Citywide network, along with Tourist areas and railway stations including Tianjin Binhai International Airport
- Harbin - Network in downtown, railway stations, Shopping malls, and Harbin Taiping International Airport
- Shenyang - Railway Stations, Tourist Areas, Shopping malls, and Shenyang Taoxian International Airport
- Shenzhen - Limited to Downtown, Tourist areas, Shopping malls, railway stations, and Shenzhen Bao'an International Airport
- Hangzhou - Downtown WiFi, tourist areas, railway stations, and Hangzhou Xiaoshan International Airport
- Suzhou - Downtown WiFi, tourist areas, and railway stations.
- Wuxi - Sunan Shuofang International Airport, Downtown, Tourist areas, railway stations, and shopping malls.
- Nanjing - Downtown, along with full district coverage, tourist areas, Railway stations, shopping malls, plazas, and Nanjing Lukou International Airport
- Xi'an - Downtown, tourist areas, railway stations, shopping malls, and Xi'an Xianyang International Airport
- Chengdu - Coverage in many areas, including downtown, plazas, and tourist areas, including Chengdu Shuangliu International Airport
- Chongqing - Downtown coverage, railway stations, tourist areas, and Chongqing Jiangbei International Airport
- Fuzhou - Coverage in downtown, railway stations, tourist areas, and Fuzhou Changle International Airport
- Ningbo - Tourist areas, railway stations, tourist areas, and Ningbo Lishe International Airport
- Foshan - Downtown Coverage, Tourist Areas, railway stations, and Foshan Shadi Airport
- Dalian - Downtown Coverage, railway stations, tourist areas, and Dalian Zhoushuizi International Airport
- Changchun - Downtown coverage, railway stations, tourist areas, shopping malls, and Changchun Longjia International Airport
- Qingdao - Downtown coverage, railway stations, tourist areas, shopping malls, and Qingdao Liuting International Airport
- Yantai - Downtown coverage, railway stations, tourist areas, shopping malls, and Yantai Penglai International Airport
- Dongguan - Downtown coverage, railway stations, tourist areas, shopping malls, and plazas, including shops, and communities.
- Macau - Downtown Coverage, including transportation centers, tourist areas, shopping malls, and Macau International Airport
- Huangshan - Downtown Coverage, including transportation centers, tourist areas, shopping malls, and Huangshan Tunxi International Airport
- Hefei - Downtown Coverage, including transportation centers, tourist areas, shopping malls, and Hefei Xinqiao International Airport
- Guiyang - Downtown Coverage, including transportation centers, tourist areas, shopping malls, and Guiyang Longdongbao International Airport
- Guangzhou - Downtown Coverage, tourist areas, transportation centers, shopping malls, and Guangzhou Baiyun International Airport
- Wuhan - Downtown Coverage, tourist areas, transportation centers, shopping malls, and Wuhan Tianhe International Airport
- Jinan - Downtown Coverage, tourist areas, transportation centers, shopping malls, and Jinan Yaoqiang International Airport
- Ordos - Downtown Coverage, tourist areas, transportation centers, shopping malls, and Ordos Ejin Horo Airport
- Xiamen - Downtown Coverage, tourist areas, transportation centers, shopping malls, and Xiamen Gaoqi International Airport
- Zhengzhou - Downtown Coverage, tourist areas, transportation centers, shopping malls, and Zhengzhou Xinzheng International Airport
- Changsha - Downtown Coverage, tourist areas, transportation centers, shopping malls, and Changsha Huanghua International Airport
- Shijiazhuang - Downtown Coverage, tourist areas, transportation centers, shopping malls, and Shijiazhuang Zhengding International Airport
- Nanning - Downtown Coverage, tourist areas, transportation centers, shopping malls, and Nanning Wuxu International Airport
- Luoyang - Downtown Coverage, tourist areas, transportation centers, shopping malls, and Luoyang Beijiao Airport
- Haikou - Downtown Coverage, tourist areas, transportation centers, shopping malls, and Haikou Meilan International Airport
- Xuzhou - Downtown Coverage, tourist areas, transportation centers, shopping malls, and Xuzhou Guanyin Airport
- Nanchang - Downtown Coverage, tourist areas, transportation centers, shopping malls, and Nanchang Changbei International Airport
- Changzhou - Downtown Coverage, tourist areas, transportation centers, shopping malls, and Changzhou Benniu Airport
- Guilin - Downtown Coverage, tourist areas, transportation centers, shopping malls, and Guilin Liangjiang International Airport
- Zhuhai - Downtown Coverage, tourist areas, transportation centers, shopping malls, and Zhuhai Jinwan Airport
- Wenzhou - Downtown Coverage, tourist areas, transportation centers, shopping malls, and Wenzhou Longwan International Airport
- Tangshan - Downtown Coverage, tourist areas, transportation centers, shopping malls, and Tangshan Sannühe Airport
- Lanzhou - Downtown Coverage, tourist areas, transportation centers, shopping malls, and Lanzhou Zhongchuan International Airport
- Xuzhou - Downtown Coverage, tourist areas, transportation centers, shopping malls, and Xuzhou Guanyin Airport
- Changsha - Downtown Coverage, tourist areas, transportation centers, shopping malls, and Changsha Huanghua International Airport
- Tangshan - Downtown Coverage, tourist areas, transportation centers, shopping malls, and Tangshan Sannühe Airport
- Nantong - Downtown Coverage, tourist areas, transportation centers, shopping malls, and Nantong Xingdong Airport
- Taiyuan - Downtown Coverage, tourist areas, transportation centers, shopping malls, and Taiyuan Wusu International Airport
- Shantou - Downtown Coverage, tourist areas, transportation centers, shopping malls, and Jieyang Chaoshan International Airport
- Yangzhou - Downtown Coverage, tourist areas, transportation centers, shopping malls, and Yangzhou Taizhou Airport
- Quanzhou - Downtown Coverage, tourist areas, transportation centers, shopping malls, and Quanzhou Jinjiang International Airport
- Kaifeng - Downtown Coverage
- Yichang - Downtown Coverage, tourist areas, transportation centers, shopping malls, and Yichang Sanxia Airport

Nearly all cities have free WiFi coverage, hosted either by their local service carrier, or city government, all railway stations in China have free WiFi, along with all Airports.

==== Taiwan ====
- Taiwan - iTaiwan, Free wifi covering government office, tourism attractions, transportation service area, constructed by the National Development Council.
- Taipei - Taipei Free Public Wi-Fi and paid service Wifly by Q-Ware Communications, Inc.
- New Taipei - free service in specific public areas in the city

=== South Asia ===
==== India ====
- Ahmedabad - Reliance Jio started free 4G services in select areas
- Bangalore - free coverage of M.G. Road and Brigade Road.
- Delhi - free Wi-Fi service in Delhi's Khan Market (August 2014), free WiFi service in Delhi's Connaught Place (November 2014), free Wi-Fi service at New Delhi Railway Station (December 2014)
- Greater Noida — paid, operated by Maksat Technologies (P) Ltd.
- Kolkata, India - free 4G service by Reliance Jio
- Faridabad, India - paid Wi-Fi Internet services being deployed by CSC E-governance Services in all Village Gram Panchayats
- Puducherry, India - paid Wi-Fi Internet services being deployed by CSC E-governance Services in all Village Gram Panchayats
- Jharkhand, India - paid Wi-Fi Internet services being deployed by CSC E-governance Services in all Village Gram Panchayats

==== Nepal ====
- Kathmandu - Paid services through multiple providers such as wlink, NTC

==== Pakistan ====
- Islamabad - Free PTCL Char G WiFi for Metro Bus, stations and routes.
- Lahore - Free Wifi service in all city.
- Rawalpindi - Free WiFi Service.
- Multan - Free WiFi Service.
- Karachi - Free Telenor WiFi

=== Southeast Asia ===
==== Cambodia ====
- Phnom Penh - WiCam, Ltd.

==== Indonesia ====
- Malang - Indoken Wireless offers roaming connectivity, T-Fi Beta offers connectivity on public transportation, free access at resource centers.

==== Malaysia ====
- Kuala Lumpur - free, Wireless@KL covering major commercial areas.
- Penang, - Penang Free Wi-Fi started in 2009, covers some commercial spots in the state, mostly on Penang Island.
- Port Dickson
- Sarawak - paid deConnexion available in most business districts in major towns in the state of Sarawak.
- Kota Kinabalu - free through KK City WiFi starting from 2017 for local residents and tourists. Each user is entitled to 10GB of quota with no time limit every day.

==== Philippines ====
- Balanga, Bataan - free in downtown and several tourist attractions
- Bogo, Cebu - free WiFi service in most government facilities provided by the city government and ICT Office.
- Calbayog, Samar - downtown area

==== Singapore ====
- Singapore - free, Wireless@SG with more than 5,000 hotspots

==== Thailand ====
- Bangkok - free service for Bangkok citizens provided by True Corporation.

==== Vietnam ====
- Hạ Long
- Hội An
- Da Nang
- Huế

=== Europe ===
==== Austria ====
- Vienna - free service around the city through the city lights, at major train stations, and in the Vienna International Airport

==== Belgium ====
- Brussels - UrbiZone covers some institutions for higher education, administration buildings, and public hospitals.

==== Bulgaria ====
- Plovdiv - free throughout the city center and some of the city's outskirts.

==== Croatia ====
- Samobor - paid & free service by NGO SMBWireless.
- Velika Gorica - free in the city center and nearby villages as a part of e-Gorica.

==== Estonia ====
- Tallinn - Tiigrihüpe free WiFi covers the capital city Tallinn and most of the country.

==== Finland ====
- Helsinki - free, city-operated network in the city center
- Oulu - free panOULU service.

==== France ====
- Paris - free in many parks and in municipal libraries, museums, and public places. Some suburbs do as well.

==== Germany ====
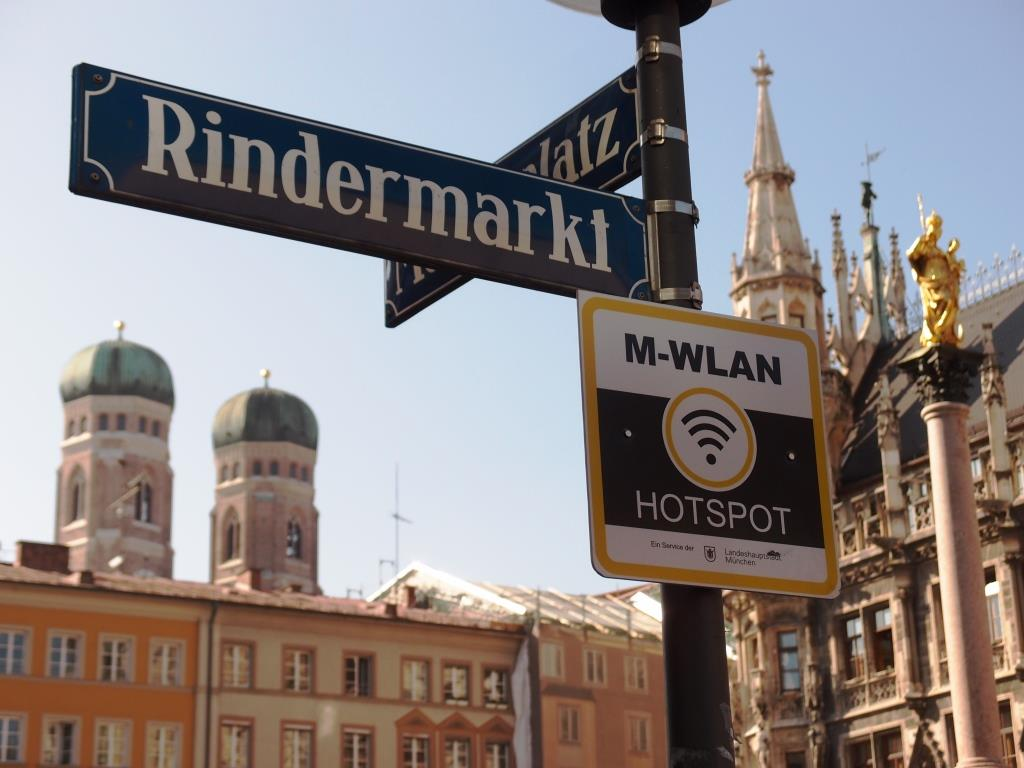
Wi-Fi sign in downtown Munich

- Munich - several areas downtown
- Stuttgart - service along the main shopping street Königstraße and a few other locations.
- Karlsruhe - most of the city center and several areas in the outer skirts.
- Cologne - Most transport hubs, tourist attractions.

==== Greece ====
- Heraklion - free, city-operated network, covers major city squares and roads.
- Lagkadas - free, city-operated, covers most of the city and is expanding to cover towns in Lagkadas municipality.

==== Ireland ====
- Dublin - free WiFi in areas of the city centre.

==== Italy ====
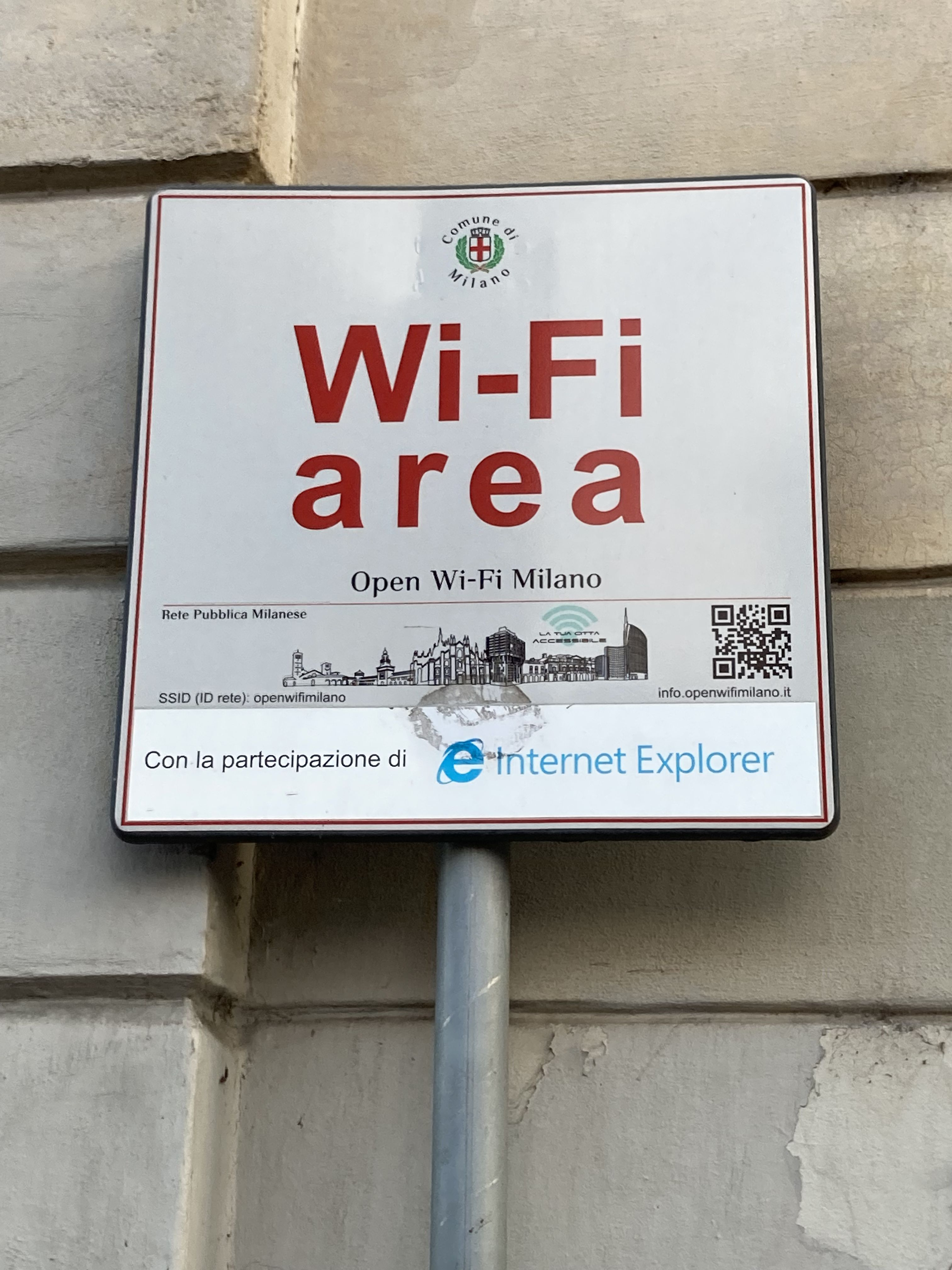
Wi-Fi sign in Milan

- Bologna - free service in and around the historical city center.
- Comiso - free service in and around the historical city center.
- Milan - free service in and around the historical city center and the Milano Malpensa airport.
- Ravenna - throughout the historic center of Ravenna there is a free wi-fi service called "Ravenna WiFi."
- Rome - The WiFimetropolitano project consists in the installation in squares, libraries and meeting places in the metropolitan area, of WiFi devices for free Internet access.
- Venice, free to residents and city users.
- Trento, free service in and around the historical city centre.

==== Lithuania ====
- Kaunas - free, in some streets of the city.

==== Luxembourg ====
- Luxembourg — paid & free service in downtown, Central Station Hotcity and European district.

==== Moldova ====
- Chişinău - two metropolitan Wi-Fi networks exist: StarNet and Orange. StarNet's paid and free coverage area includes the city's central streets and residential districts as well as parks. Orange paid coverage area includes the city's mass transit areas and bus stops.

==== Netherlands ====
- Almere - free municipal Wi-Fi covering Downtown Almere
- Hilversum - free municipal Wi-Fi covering Downtown Hilversum and the shopping area around de Gijsbrecht van Amstelstraat in the southern part of town
- Leiden - free, community project covering city and region by Wireless Leiden

==== Norway ====
- Trondheim - paid and free service in city centre.

==== Poland ====
- Rzeszów - free, city-operated in participating public schools.
- Wrocław - free service by Miejski Internet, in few places.

==== Romania ====
- Brașov, Romania - free WiFi over the entire city deployed into existing 5G network by worldwifizone.com of Ireland, over 40,000 daily users at peak.
- Roman, Romania - free, deployed by Minisoft Romania as part of MetroWireless free internet access project, paid by advertisements, covers much of the city, expanding to nearby villages
- Vatra Dornei, Romania, 85% of city covered with free WiFi deployed by worldwifizone.com using free guest user and Facebook connect.

==== Russia ====
- Moscow, Russia - MaximaTelecom, award-winning Moscow Metro and public transport public network
- Moscow, Russia - paid service, Golden Telecom

==== Serbia ====
- Zrenjanin, Serbia - free, city center only
- Pančevo, Serbia - free, city center only, with time limit session.

==== Slovenia ====
- Ljubljana, Slovenia - free for 1 hour, city center only

==== Spain ====
- Moralzarzal, Spain - free for inscribed citizens, limited time for visitors.
- Madrid, Spain - free and open Wi-Fi on the municipal bus system, EMT.

==== Sweden ====
- Helsingborg, Sweden - unrestricted, free and city-operated in 220 locations around the town. SSID: Helsingborg Helpdesk: #freewifihbg on most social platforms.
- Lidköping, Sweden - unrestricted, free and commercially operated. Available in town square. SSID: Lidkoping
- Örebro, Sweden - free, around Järntorget.
- Malmö, Sweden - free, operated by Pjodd.se, sharing around 65 access points around central town.

==== Switzerland ====
- Geneva, Switzerland - free, city-operated

==== Ukraine ====
- Kyiv, Ukraine - free WiFi in certain areas of city centre and Passenger Railway Station.

==== United Kingdom ====
- Aberdeen - free access across city centre introduced in April 2017.
- Blackpool - free, 1.6 km area around city centre Wireless Blackpool - Wireless Blackpool Leaflet
- Bristol - free, 3 km area around city centre
- Dundee - free access, limited to the redeveloped waterfront area from July 2018, with plans for wider coverage.
- Edinburgh - free coverage across the city centre was introduced in summer 2016.
- Fort William - free, town centre.
- Glasgow - free citywide access introduced in Scotland's largest city as part of an initiative called "Urban Wireless" by British Telecom in July 2014.
- Inverness - free, city centre.
- Liverpool - paid service, covering central areas.
- Newcastle, Northern Ireland
- Norwich - free, city center and university, 18-month pilot Openlink (Norwich, UK)
- Sheffield - free, covering the entire city centre; currently under development since December 2017.
- York - free, entire city centre, museums, libraries and universities

=== North America ===
==== Canada ====
- Fredericton, New Brunswick - free, Fred-e Zone
- Iqaluit, Nunavut - Community Free Access and Paid Service provided by Meshnet, and service of mnemonics.ca
- London, Ontario - free (pilot project) on Dundas Street, provided by London Downtown Business Association
- Mississauga, Ontario - free, Wireless access at Mississauga Libraries, Community Centres, Arenas and select transit stops
- Moncton, New Brunswick - free, Service provided by Red Ball Internet of Moncton. Wireless access available at Arenas and Moncton's Public Library. It was also the first city in Canada to provide wireless internet on its public transportation fleet.
- Montreal, Quebec - free, community supported Ilesansfil
- Moose Jaw, Saskatchewan - free, city center and campus
- Prince Albert, Saskatchewan - free, city center and campus
- Quebec City, Quebec - free, community supported ZAP Quebec
- Regina, Saskatchewan - free, city center and campus
- Saint-Hyacinthe, Quebec - free service in selected parks, municipal buildings and commercial center, provided by ZAP Monteregie
- Saskatoon, Saskatchewan - free, city center and campus
- Sherbrooke, Québec - free, limited to downtown, provided by ZAP Sherbrooke
- Shawinigan, Quebec - free service, limited to downtown. City-operated.
- Stratford, Ontario - paid service, covers entire city.
- Toronto, Ontario - There is a list of free services at the city's ConnectTO website and the Toronto Public Library system for locations throughout the Greater Toronto Area
- Windsor, Ontario- free service for the downtown core provided by the Downtown Windsor Business Improvement Association.

==== United States ====
- Akron, Ohio: ConnectAkron
- Albany, New York Albanyfreenet
- Albuquerque, New Mexico
- Amherst, Massachusetts - free service in downtown area
- Anderson, Indiana free WiFi
- Arcata, California
- Baldwin, Georgia - free Public WiFi available in select locations.
- Baltimore, Maryland free WiFi
- Bethany Beach, Delaware Beach and Boardwalk free WiFi
- Binghamton, New York - free service,
- Boston, Massachusetts - Wicked Free WiFi available throughout the City of Boston for the public to use
- Brevard County, Florida - free at all County Library Buildings
- Bristol, Virginia
- Burlington, North Carolina - Free public WiFi in select downtown areas.
- Burlington, Vermont - Citywide WiFi hotspots through Burlington Telecom
- Cambridge, Massachusetts - free (pilot), through the Cambridge Public Internet (CPI) Initiative
- Cedar Rapids, Iowa - has Free WiFi Downtown & around the city
- Charleston, South Carolina - free public wi-fi in Marion Square
- Chattanooga, Tennessee - free public WiFi citywide; operated by EPB
- Chicago - free public WiFi in many public places; municipally operated; no technical support
- Clearwater Beach, Florida - free service,
- Cleveland, Ohio—free service in the Old Brooklyn neighborhood
- Corpus Christi, Texas - paid service, Earthlink
- Decatur, Georgia - Free WiFi in Downtown Decatur
- Dubuque, Iowa - free, city-operated, provided Mediacom covers downtown area since 2006.
- El Paso, Texas - Free WiFi in Downtown El Paso.
- Englewood, New Jersey - Free ultra fast WiFi throughout almost two miles of downtown Englewood 2014.
- Escondido, California - free service in downtown area and Public Library.
- Fenton, Michigan - free or paid service in downtown area and public parks, through Tri-County Wireless, Inc.
- Gerlach, Nevada - Gifted to the public by Black Rock City LLC.
- Greensboro, North Carolina - Free WiFi in Downtown Greensboro, Greensboro Historical Museum, The Depot, and others.
- Harrisburg, North Carolina - free, Time Warner Cable
- Hattiesburg, Mississippi Free WiFi in the downtown area of Front, Main and Pine Streets and the Oaks Cultural District.
- Hollywood, Florida - Johnson Controls, Sling Broadband Wimax deploy municipal Wi-Fi network for wireless automated meter reading (AMR), public safety and free Wi-Fi service for residents. Muni Wireless
- Houston, Texas - free service in downtown area and selected neighborhoods around the city; free service also available in all Houston Public Library and Harris County Public Library branches
- Honolulu, Hawaii - free, Tri-Net Solutions LLC
- Hiawatha Iowa - Has Free WiFi at Public parks & Public Library
- Indianapolis, Indiana -free AT&T WiFi downtown
- Kansas City, Missouri - free WiFi downtown through Sprint/AT&T
- Kennesaw, Georgia - free, City of Kennesaw WiFi - available in city parks and other areas
- Kenosha, Wisconsin - Low Cost Paid WiFi located in Downtown Kenosha, service provided by Infinite Technologies LLC
- Kenosha, Wisconsin - Expensive Lake coverage pre-approved by Kenosha County Board without pre-approval by the City of Kenosha was declined by the City 2/13/2014. The ISP service the County was attempting would undermine the existing small business owner, who has found it a challenge for the city to accept any attempts to grow the WiFi.
- Kissimmee, Florida - free, Bright House Networks
- Lafayette, Louisiana
- Lawrence, Kansas - free, Lawrence Freenet, not-for-profit company that works in conjunction with the City of Lawrence and local internet providers
- Lenoir City, Tennessee - Paid fiber-optic broadband service by the Lenoir City Utilities Board in collaboration with the Tennessee Valley Authority. Operates in Xnox, Loudon, and Roane counties in Tennessee.
- Leverett, Massachusetts
- Lexington, Kentucky - SSID: "LexingtonPublic" free, originally only for police, firefighters and civil service employees, available along major streets miles outside downtown, available in downtown, East End and Cardinal Hill neighborhoods
- Linden, Michigan - free or paid service in downtown area and public parks, through Tri-County Wireless, Inc.
- Los Lunas, New Mexico
- Longmont, Colorado - Municipal gigabit fiber citywide.
- Madison, Wisconsin - paid, only covers central part of city.
- Marion, Illinois - Free. Initially just the downtown square but plans to expand to Public Safety.
- Maywood, California - Free. Initially just the business corridors, now citywide.
- Minneapolis, Minnesota - paid, USI Wireless
- Mountain View, California - free (no longer operating) - Google WiFi
- Naperville, Illinois - free, downtown area only, known as "napernet"
- New York City - LinkNYC began service in 2016; intended to have thousands of stations
- Newton, North Carolina - free, downtown area
- Ocala, Florida - Free, Downtown Square
- Pacifica, California - paid service, PacificaNet
- Palm Bay, Florida - free at City Hall and six parks, Map
- Peachtree City, Georgia - free at two parks and the public library/City Hall plaza -
- Philomath, Oregon - free 300 kbit/s access, paid tiers. Serves city limits: also has APs in downtown Corvallis.
- Pittsburgh, Pennsylvania - free downtown 2 hours per day
- Plattsmouth, Nebraska - free in all public buildings (Court House, Public Library, City Hall, Community Center) and Main Street
- Ponca City, Oklahoma - covers the whole city
- Powell, Ohio - Free, covers downtown
- Rochester, Minnesota - Downtown in Peace Plaza, near the Mayo Clinic and University of Minnesota Rochester
- Rockport, Maine
- San Jose, California - Free in downtown area, and in key low resource neighborhoods through the East Side Access partnership with East Side Union High School District
- Santa Clara, California - Free, outdoors in most areas of the city
- Santa Monica, California - Free, outdoors in most areas of the city
- Skokie, Illinois, - Downtown and park areas
- Southaven, Mississippi - paid service, city-operated, branded as Magnoliawave
- South Bend, Indiana - Free service intended to establish downtown as a meeting place and bridge the digital divide
- Spokane, Washington - two free hours/day, paid after.
- Statesville, North Carolina- free access
- Storrs, Connecticut - used for students of The University of Connecticut
- Springfield, Ohio - free, downtown and Clark State Community College campus
- The Dalles, Oregon - free, via Google grant to downtown and key event areas. City-operated.
- Wilkes-Barre, Pennsylvania - Day pass, monthly service, or even pre-paid wireless data cards are available
- Williamsburg, Virginia - free, limited to Merchants Square
- Winston-Salem, North Carolina - free, limited to downtown. City-operated: no technical support.
- Warwick, Massachusetts - paid service, municipally-operated
- Yazoo City, Mississippi - Paid network. Branded as Yazoo Wireless, Provided by CYTEC
- Yorktown, Indiana - Free, limited to downtown

In addition, a few U.S. states, such as Illinois, Iowa, and Massachusetts, offer free Wi-Fi service at welcome centers and roadside rest areas located along major Interstate highways.

==== Mexico ====
- Guadalajara, Jalisco - Free, 150 parks and municipal areas. 1 hour continuous connect and 2 hour connection time allowed per day. In operation since 2011. Installation and operation is municipal government funded. A few of the areas are provided with free electrical outlets to charge / use your device.
- Mérida, Yucatán - Free. Most major city parks and other areas. Provided by Axtel and Telmex. Usually also provide standing tables with power outlets. The parks are identified by "parque en linea" (online park) signs and branding of the utility providing the connectivity. The SSID is usually "park en linea".

=== Oceania ===
- Adelaide, Australia - AdelaideFree WiFi is a contiguous network available throughout the CBD, provided by Internode
- Auckland, New Zealand - Citywide network based in all popular areas across Auckland including CBD and Waterfront from Tomizone.
- Brisbane, Australia - in public areas and the Brisbane central business district.
- Hawke's Bay, New Zealand, prepaid access and free 1 hour daily, available at many locations region wide via NOW.
- Margaret River, Western Australia, This free public WiFi is provided by Margaret River Rotary Club and covers the main street all the way up to Reuther Park at the corner of Bussell Hwy & Wallcliffe Rd, Margaret River WA 6285.
- Melbourne, Australia - VICFREE WiFi is available outdoors in the Melbourne central business district (CBD), including Bourke Street Mall, Queen Victoria Market, the Melbourne Convention and Exhibition Centre, Melbourne Museum, and on platforms in CBD train stations, in addition to central Ballarat and central Bendigo. Telstra also has hotspots available to Telstra and Fon customers across Australia.
- Nelson, New Zealand - Public areas within central business district
- Newcastle, Australia - Since 2019, launched free public wifi across eastern parts of the city, allowing residents and visitors to connect to smart poles without a password.
- Perth, Australia - paid, RoamAD-based metro wide coverage in the central business district by metromesh
- Wellington, New Zealand - Free WiFi at the Waterfront, central business district & Airport

=== South America ===
- Aparecida, Brazil Free service
- Belo Horizonte, Brazil
- La Plata, Argentina - free, city center only
- Buenos Aires, Argentina - free, without registration, 120 spots for all over the city
- General Lavalle, Argentina - Free service
- Resistencia, Chaco, Argentina - free, without registration, 12 spots for all over the city.
- Sud Mennucci, Brazil—free, limited to downtown. City-operated.
- Medellin, Colombia City-operated free wifi in over 180 locations.
- Miraflores, Lima Peru Free service, various spots over the district. City-operated.

=== Planned ===
==== Africa ====
- Stellenbosch, South Africa Free service. Town centre online since February 25, 2012. Coverage to be increased to whole town.
- Northpine, South Africa Paid. WISP and media delivery services as well as video surveillance focused on the suburb. Community social portal for information sharing, collaboration and local business partnerships. Proof of concept to be expanded to neighbouring areas.
- Harare, Zimbabwe Available around the city on various hotspots. Provided by ZOL. 1 hour time limit, paid after.

==== South Asia ====
- Delhi, India - Delhi Government constituted a Task Force (March 2015) to provide Free Wi-Fi connectivity in Delhi. The new Task Force is a part of Delhi Dialogue Commission (DDC), an advisory body of the Aam Aadmi Party government, Aam Aadmi Party government decide to consult with various stakeholders to implement its pre-poll promise of providing Free Wi-Fi connectivity across the city, Delhi Dialogue Commission (DDC) chaired by Chief Minister Arvind Kejriwal asks people for suggestions for Free WiFi plan (March 2015)
- Dhaka, Bangladesh Free WiFi is now available in Dhaka Airport Road, Dhanmondi Lake Park, Selected BRTC Buses, Kamlapur Railway Station, Airport Railstation and Dhanmondi Residential Area. The Free WiFi Networks are provided by telecom operators, notably Robi and Aamra. The service is to be rolled out in full Northern Dhaka within December 2018
- Mumbai, India
- NOIDA, India
- Karachi, Pakistan

==== Southeast Asia ====
- Makati, Philippines

==== West Asia ====
- Tel Aviv Downtown and later north part as well.

==== Europe ====
- Swindon, Wiltshire, UK
- Leicester, UK
- London, UK (London Underground)

==== North America ====
- Mexico City, Mexico free, coupled with new surveillance system (planned 2008)
- Panama
- Tecumseh, Ontario

===== United States =====
- Oakland County, Michigan - free 128 kbit/s, paid for high speed, Wireless Oakland
- Sacramento, California
- Silicon Valley, California Joint Venture Wireless Project - free, prototyped for Palo Alto and San Carlos by 2008, Silicon Valley Metro Connect.
- St. Louis Park, Minnesota - Set up, but not yet deployed due to contracting disputes.
- Tampa, Florida - Tampabayconnect.net
- Waukesha, Wisconsin

==== Oceania ====
- Brisbane, Australia
- Canberra, Australia
- Melbourne, Australia
- Ballarat, Australia
- Bendigo, Australia

==== South America ====
- Jacareí, Brazil
- São José dos Campos, Brazil
- São Paulo, Brazil

=== Canceled or closed ===
- Baton Rouge, United States
- Charleston, South Carolina, United States (on hold)
- Dublin, Ireland
- Groningen, Netherlands - Municipal Wireless network with open service model, covering entire city, first parts operational, 2010–2012 expanding to 54sq km
- MetroFi - free with advertisements, deployed to 10 cities in the western United States, closed in 2008
- Milwaukee, Wisconsin, United States - paid service, Midwest Fiber Networks, target date: March 2008
- New Orleans, Louisiana, United States
- Parramatta, Australia
- Portland, Oregon, United States
- Puerto Montt, Chile
- Regional Municipality of Waterloo, Canada - plans to create paid service to cover the entire Waterloo Region, specifically Kitchener, Ontario, Waterloo, Ontario, Cambridge, Ontario (The "Tri-City Area"), to be provided by Atria Networks, was scrapped in 2011 as Atria has been acquired by Rogers Communications, no explanation was given.
- Riverside, California, United States
- San Francisco, California, United States
- Sydney, Australia
- Tempe, Arizona, United States - paid service, Kite Networks
- Dubrovnik, Croatia - closed when the new mayor took over

== See also ==
- List of deployed WiMAX networks
- Municipal broadband
- Switched mesh
