= Ertuğrul (disambiguation) =

Ertuğrul (died c. 1280) was the father of Osman I, the founder of the Ottoman Empire.

It may also refer to:

== People ==
=== Given name ===
- Mustafa Ertuğrul Aker (1892–1961), Ottoman Army officer
- Ertuğrul Apakan (born 1947), Turkish diplomat
- Ertuğrul Arslan (born 1980), Turkish footballer
- Ertuğrul Bayrak (born 1992), Dutch-Turkish kickboxer
- Ertuğrul Ergezen (1978–2024), Turkish boxer
- Ertuğrul Oğuz Fırat (1923–2014), Turkish composer, painter and poet
- Ertuğrul Günay (born 1948), Turkish politician
- Ertuğrul Işınbark (1940–2014), Turkish stage magician
- Ertuğrul Kürkçü (born 1968), Turkish socialist and politician
- Ertuğrul Osman (1912–2009), Imperial Prince of the Ottoman Empire
- Ertuğrul Özkök (born 1947), Turkish journalist
- Ertuğrul Sağlam (born 1969), Turkish football coach and former player
- Ertuğrul Seçme (born 1965), Turkish football player and coach
- Ertuğrul Taşkıran (born 1989), Turkish footballer
- Ertuğrul Yalçınbayır (born 1946), Turkish lawyer and politician

=== Surname ===
- Bülent Ertuğrul (born 1979), Turkish footballer
- Çağlar Ertuğrul (born 1987), Turkish actor
- Kent Ertugrul, American chief executive
- Muhsin Ertuğrul (1892–1979), Turkish theatre actor and director
- Münire Eyüp Ertuğrul (1902–1943), Turkish actress

== Places ==
- Ertuğrul Gazi Mosque, a mosque in Ashgabat, Turkmenistan
- Ertuğrul Tekke mosque, a mosque in Istanbul, Turkey
- Ertuğrul, Çorum, a village in Turkey
- Ertuğrul, Güney, a village in Turkey

== Other ==
- Diriliş: Ertuğrul, a Turkish television series running from 2014 to 2019
- Ottoman frigate Ertuğrul, sailing frigate of the Ottoman Navy
- Ertuğrul Bey, the main protagonist in Diriliş: Ertuğrul, based on the father of Osman
- MT Botaş FSRU Ertuğrul Gazi, Turkish floating storage regasification unit
