= Marcus Williamson =

British writer, journalist, and campaigner

Marcus Williamson is a British writer, journalist, and campaigner. As an obituarist, he has written obituaries of more than 400 subjects, including artists, scientists, poets, musicians, actors and inventors for The Independent, The Guardian, The Scotsman and Jewish Chronicle .

== Campaigns ==
=== Phorm ===
In 2009, the AIM-listed (since delisted and failed) spyware company Phorm created a website Stopphoulplay.com to attack Williamson and fellow campaigner Alexander Hanff. The company accused Williamson of '...waging a "serial letter writing" campaign to Phorm's potential customers and partners in attempt to discredit the company and Mr Ertugrul.' The site was soon taken down and later described as a "PR disaster".

=== CEOemail.com ===
He is the editor of the consumer information website CEOemail.com, which provides the email addresses of many company CEOs. The website is free for non-professional users, with a fee for business users for each email address provided.

In 2010, he revealed that the CEO of the Nationwide Building Society had closed down his email address, rather than face emails from upset customers.

== Publications ==
- The True Celtic Language and the Stone Circle of Rennes les Bains. 2008. ISBN 978-1257639526. Translation of an 1886 work by Henri Boudet.
- Claude Cahun at School in England. Lulu, 2011. ISBN 978-1-257639-52-6.
- Path. Atelier St Louis Production, 2011. With Jonathan Moss. ISBN 978-0-956833-40-2.
- Rene Halkett: From Bauhaus to Cornwall. Catalogue of exhibition at Falmouth Art Gallery, 2019.
- The International Encyclopedia of Surrealism. Bloomsbury Visual Arts, 2019. Williamson contributed biographical articles on Raymond Roussel, Sarane Alexandrian, Ithell Colquhoun, David Gascoyne and Isabelle Waldberg.
