= MetroFi =

- Founded: 2002
- Products: Municipal wireless network

MetroFi was a provider of municipal wireless network service in several cities in the western United States.

== History ==
MetroFi was founded in 2002 by Chuck Haas, who helped start Covad, and Pankaj Shah, in Mountain View, California. Investors included Sevin Rosen Funds, August Capital, and Western Technology Investments. Funding of $9 million was announced in April 2004, as well as an "Investors' Choice" award at the Dow Jones Wireless Ventures private equity conference.

MetroFi announced conventional Wi-Fi wireless Internet access to municipalities in September 2005 at the MuniWireless show in San Francisco. It began offering free, advertising-supported, unencrypted, low-bandwidth wireless Internet access in December 2005 in parts of its local Silicon Valley area. In most of its service areas it provided an unencrypted, advertising-supported "free" service as well as an encrypted (using Wi-Fi Protected Access), ad-free "premium" service for approximately $20 per month. During 2006, its data rate was restricted to 1 Mbit/s downstream and 256 kbit/s upstream. Coverage and performance of the premium and free service was otherwise identical. MetroFi also provided fixed-wireless service.

The company planned to use wireless mesh network technology from SkyPilot, and the Webwise targeted advertising service from Phorm.

Cities covered, according to the MetroFi Web site, included:

- California: Concord, Cupertino, Foster City, Riverside, San Jose, Santa Clara, and Sunnyvale
- Illinois: Aurora
- Oregon: Portland

The Riverside announcement included a partnership with AT&T announced in July 2006.

A test of the ability to get a connection in outdoor areas within 500 feet of an access point in the Portland proof-of-concept network in the early spring of 2007 showed about a 58% probability using a standard 30 mW, low-gain client device. The report concluded that the probability the network was providing a connection to those devices in 90% of outdoor areas, as called for, was two in a billion. The Portland network was less than 30% complete, and as of October 2007 further deployment halted. The contract with Portland required MetroFi to complete the network by August 2009. A group monitoring the Portland network estimated that the network provided a 90% probability of getting a connection outdoors in about 4% of the city in late 2007.

On May 15, 2008, MetroFi announced that it was seeking buyers for its networks. Having failed to find a buyer, it scheduled and performed a shutdown of its network on June 20, 2008. MetroFi offered to sell its Portland network to the city. However, in October 2008, assets of the Portland network were seized by the city as abandoned. Santa Clara acquired the MetroFi network in that city to support its Silicon Valley Power utility. It redesigned and expanded service in 2012.
