= Minneapolis wireless internet network =

Overview of wireless internet in Minneapolis

The logo of Wireless Minneapolis

The city of Minneapolis, Minnesota, is covered by a citywide broadband wireless internet network, sometimes called Wireless Minneapolis. The network was first proposed in 2003, at which point only a few other cities nationwide had such systems in place. Local firm US Internet beat out EarthLink to build and operate the network, with a guaranteed ten-year, multimillion-dollar contract from the city itself as the network's anchor tenant. Construction began on the project in 2006, but encountered several delays. Most of the city was covered by the network by 2010, and USI Wireless, the subsidiary of US Internet responsible for the system, set up numerous free internet access points at public locations around Minneapolis.

The network, which offers speeds of one to six megabits per second at a rate of about $20 per month, had about 20,000 residential subscribers by the end of 2010. Municipally, the network is used by city inspectors and employees, with plans in place for the police and fire departments to use it in the future. In 2007, when the I-35W Mississippi River bridge collapsed, the wireless system helped coordinate rescuers and emergency services. The city and USI Wireless have won praise for the network, which has been singled out for being one of the few successful municipal wireless ventures nationwide among a number of stalled or failed projects.

== Background ==
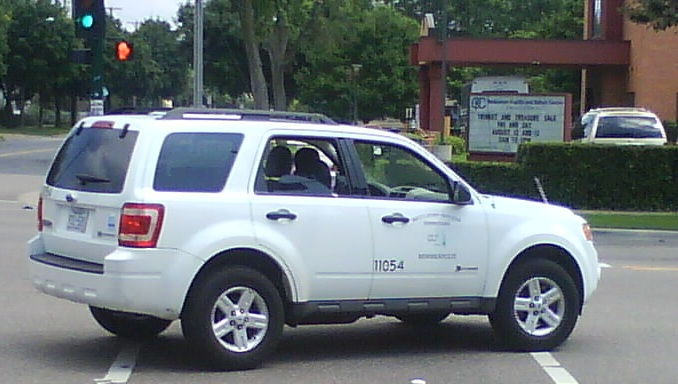
Minneapolis city inspectors (vehicle pictured) used Sprint Cellular while working in the field, prior to the implementation of the wireless network.

At the time when the wireless network was under consideration, various other American cities already had such networks or were in the process of constructing them. Chaska and Moorhead, both in Minnesota, had city-owned and -operated wireless networks, while Philadelphia was considering building its own and Corpus Christi, Texas, was experimenting with a specialized government-use-only network.

Before the network was built, Minneapolis's city services were run on a combination of fiber optics and other services, with city inspectors, who worked throughout the city, using Sprint Cellular while working in the field. Around the same time, in 2005, Popular Science ranked Minneapolis as the "Top Tech City" in America, citing factors such as the city's 110 wireless hotspots, compared to the national average of 61 at the time.

== History ==
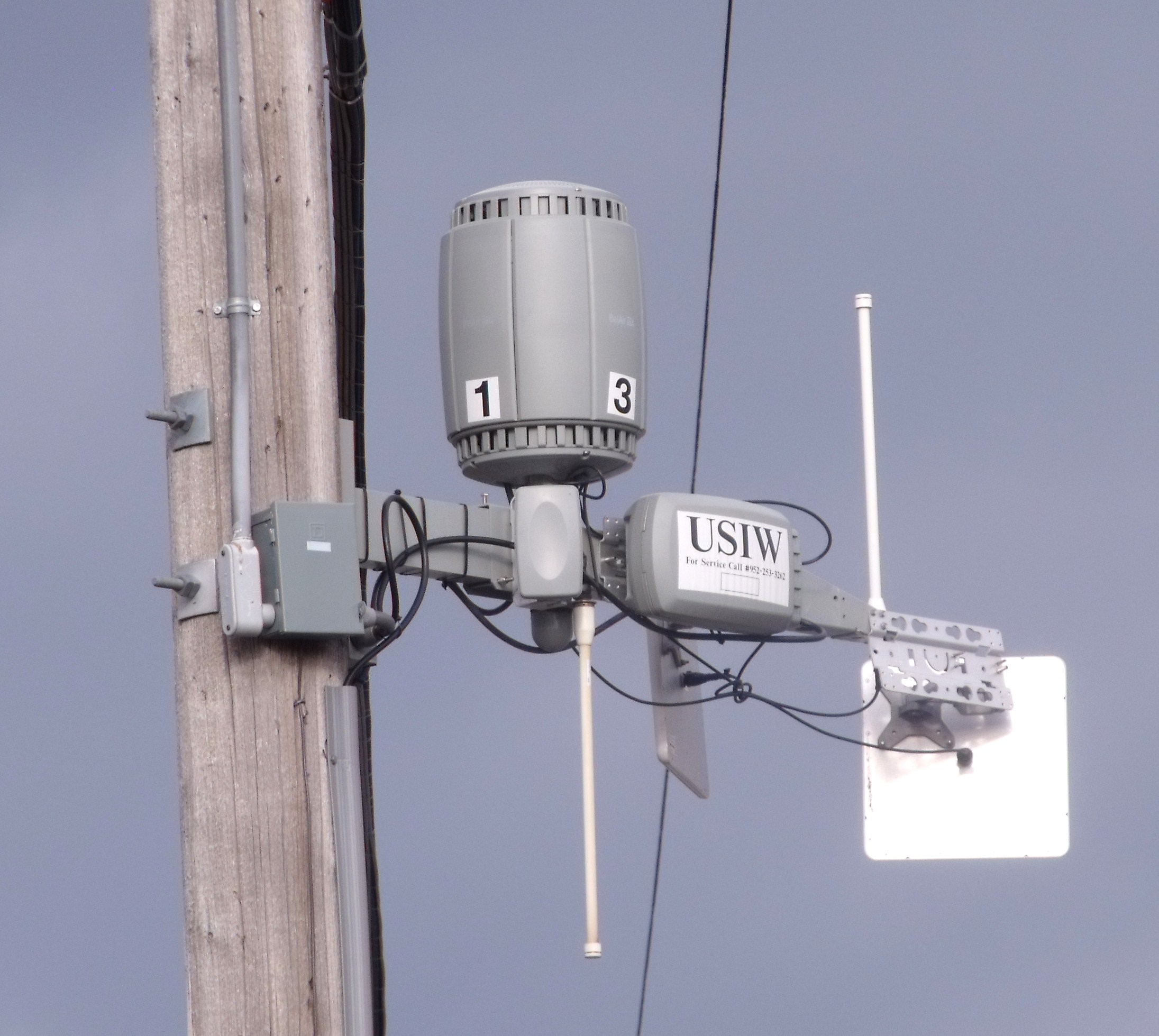
One of the 1,800 access points installed on telephone poles around the city

The initiative to construct a citywide wireless internet network, initiated in 2003 by city councilmember Gary Schiff, aimed to both offer city residents with wireless access for around $20 per month, and also to improve city services such as fire and police by giving them greater access to information while en route or on-site anywhere in the city. Bridging the digital divide in the city was also a stated goal for the network.

Several ownership schemes were considered in the process of building and running the system. One plan, which named city officials as the owners and operators of the network, was scrapped because the city lacked the core competency to do it on its own, as well as the $25–30 million capital investment required for the initial construction. The plan which was ultimately adopted entailed a private company building and running the network. This plan met opposition from the Institute for Local Self Reliance, an organization that stated that it believed that the city should build the network itself, and then contract a private company to maintain it.

The city opened up bidding for the construction of the network in 2005, eventually receiving bids from eight different internet service providers. Of these eight, Atlanta-based EarthLink and Minnetonka-based US Internet were selected as semifinalists, and each company set up a trial program in Minneapolis before the final decision was made. During this process, outcry arose from both members of the Institute for Local Self Reliance about the lack of public hearings on the subject of the network, and from Qwest, another internet service provider who had placed a bid to build and run the network, about the city's plan to be involved in the wireless internet business at all. The deputy chief information officer of Minneapolis, Bill Beck, stated that the city was worried about legal restrictions and lawsuits, which were key reasons for the lack of transparency in the process.

US Internet was selected by the Minneapolis City Council to build the city's network late in the summer of 2006. The firm was guaranteed a 10-year, $12.5 million contract with the city as its anchor tenant. USI Wireless, a wholly owned subsidiary of US Internet, was tasked with installing 1,800 radio transmitters for the wireless network upon light poles, telephone poles, buildings, and other structures. Construction was slated to begin three to four weeks after the city selected US Internet, around the beginning of October 2006, and was expected to be completed by the following autumn. The network is sometimes referred to as Wireless Minneapolis.

US Internet also provides wired fiber optic connections that were available, as of April 2014, to around 12,600 residents of Minneapolis. Connections ran as quickly as 1Gbit/s for $99 per month, about half the price of a 25 Mbit/s connection from Comcast. Later that year, the company announced plans to bring its internet services farther afield to the broader Minneapolis–Saint Paul metropolitan area and nationally. US Internet announced in December of the same year that it would bring 10 Gbit/s service to Minneapolis making it the first municipality in the world to have access at that speed.

== Availability and usage ==
Minneapolis was intended to be covered in its entirety by the wireless network, with certain exceptions (such as the Eloise Butler Wildflower Garden, which lacked the infrastructure to support such a system). The city's numerous lakes were also ruled out for network coverage, since sending and receiving signals on them would require transmission poles in the water. The first area of the city to receive the service was Downtown Minneapolis, though it was delayed two weeks there due to technical challenges posed by the skyscrapers in the area, as well as the uneven terrain of the Mississippi River on the east side of the area. The goal was to blanket the entire city with the network by November 2007 and in spite of delays, USI Wireless expected that the next area for installation, a residential neighborhood, would be easier thanks to its flat terrain. In late 2008, however, the completion of the network was stuck at 82% because of a misunderstanding between the Minneapolis Park and Recreation Board, who stated that USI Wireless could not install their radio transmitters on park land without the proper permits, and USI Wireless, who had been unaware of this. A further delay in 2008 came in the form of light poles that were breaking under the stress of the wireless transmitters being placed upon them in neighborhoods in the Calhoun-Isles area of the city. In response, the city paid $1 million to install new light poles in the area that would be capable of supporting the transmitters. By 2009, almost the entirety of the city's 59 square miles (152.8 km^{2}) was covered by the network, with certain "Challenge Areas" being fitted with special equipment.

In 2006, when US Internet was selected to construct the network, plans existed for the wireless service to be available to residents for a subscription of $19.95 per month, for speeds of one to three megabits per second, which were comparable to the speeds being offered by other internet service providers in the area at the time but at half the cost. USI Wireless has been marketing the service since then, including with billboards featuring local personality Fancy Ray McCloney.

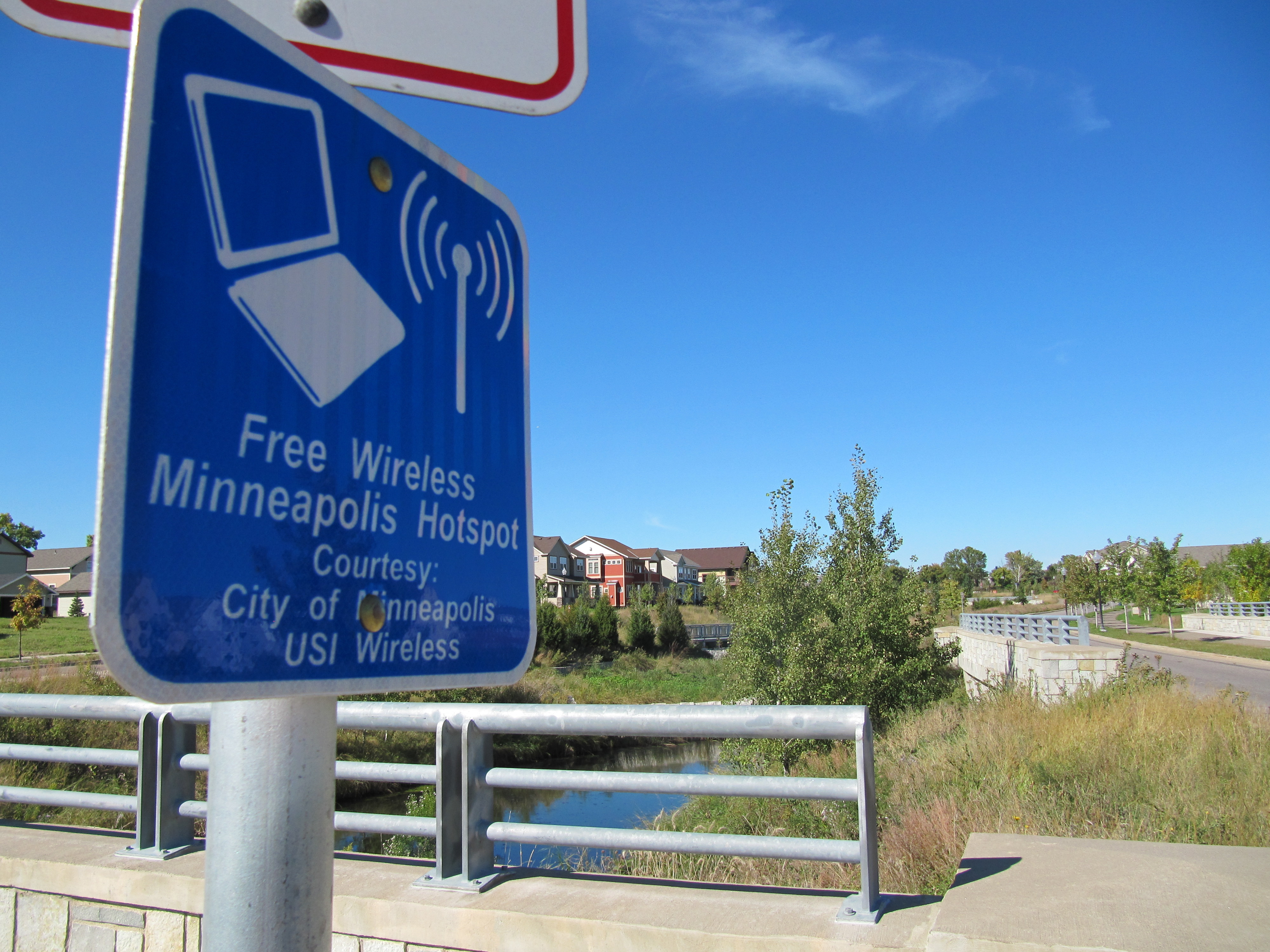
A sign denoting one of the free wireless hotspots scattered around Minneapolis

By December 2010, USI Wireless had approximately 20,000 subscribers, according to the company's CEO, Joe Caldwell. The company's original target was 30,000 subscribers by 2012; Caldwell expected the company would reach this milestone by 2013, due to delays in setting the network up. Nonetheless, the firm made a $1.2 million profit in 2010 and counted 27,000 subscribers by 2014. Meanwhile, in 2010, the city of Minneapolis was paying $1.25 million annually for the wireless service but using only six percent of the capacity which it had purchased. Some complaints were raised by various municipal departments from whose budgets the cost of the network subscription was being deducted, regardless of whether they were utilizing it. More departments, however, were beginning to use the network, including city inspectors and 90 other city employees, a trend which was expected to lead to a usage of fourteen percent of the city's purchased capacity by the end of 2011.

The city of Minneapolis had connected 30 security cameras and 35 electronic street signs to the network by the end of 2010, with the intention to connect 50 network-enabled parking meters and 10 garbage trucks to the system in the near future. Fire and police conversion to the citywide network was also underway, though the city was taking necessary precautions to ensure that the two services, who will ultimately have their own dedicated frequency, continue to offer uninterrupted public safety service.

About 200 free wireless access points were set up around the city to aid with the city's goal of increasing access to the internet. US Internet paid $500,000 up front and agreed to pay five percent of its yearly revenues for seven years to maintain them, totaling about $10 million. By 2010, 44 such points had been set up at community centers around Minneapolis, out of a total of 117 which had also gone up in parks and on street corners around the city. Per the request of law enforcement officials who were concerned about the potential ability to surf the internet anonymously, the free login points require the user to enter a username, password, and credit card number.

=== Emergency preparedness ===
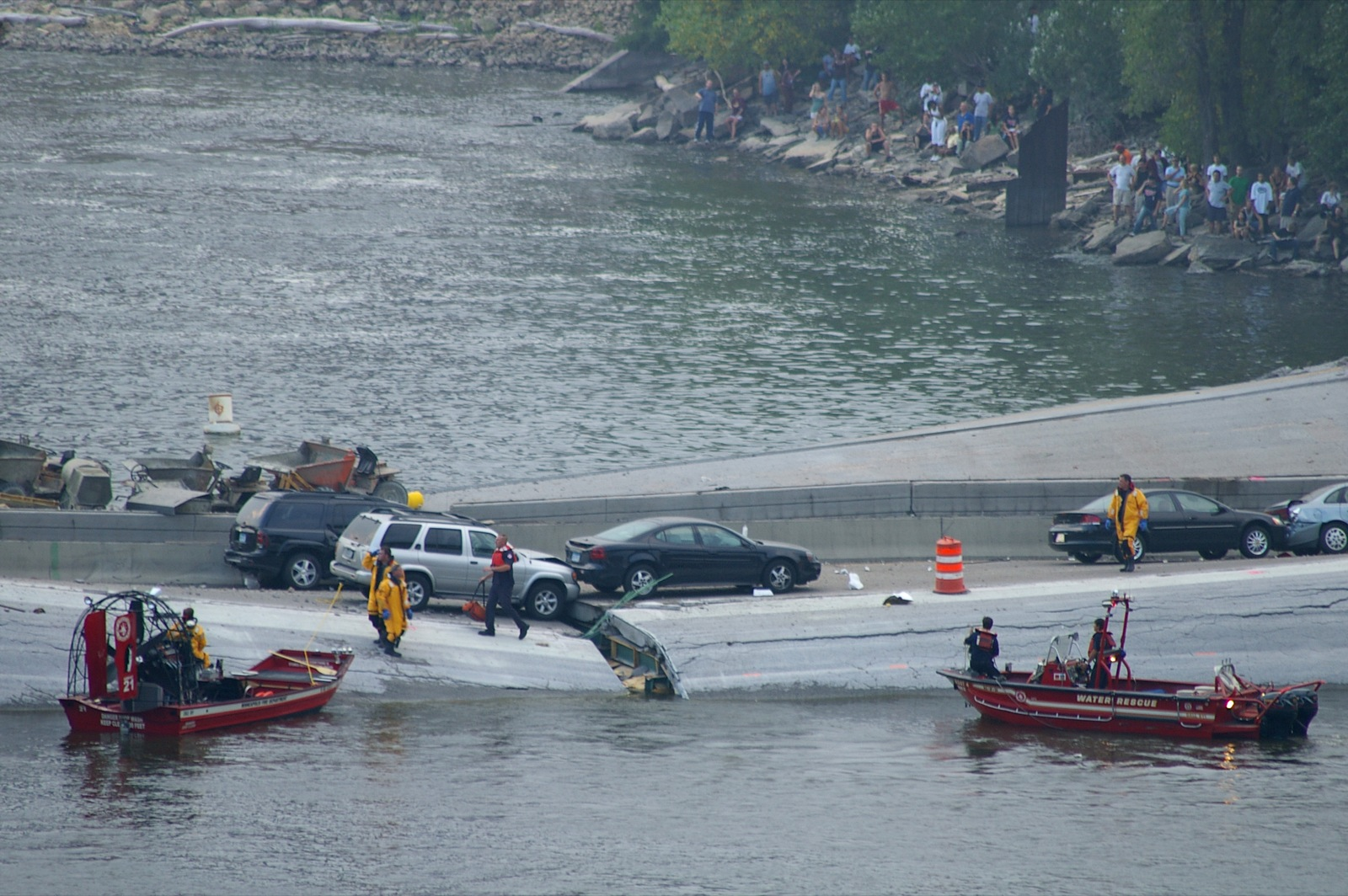
Emergency workers on the I-35W Mississippi River bridge, soon after its collapse

Minneapolis's wireless network was built with emergency preparedness in mind, a consideration which Caldwell noted was always a part of the proposals for such networks. It was not until the collapse of the I-35W Mississippi River bridge on August 1, 2007, however, that this application of the network was truly tested. By that point, USI Wireless had managed to cover about 18 square miles (46.6 km^{2}) of the city with its network. Conveniently, much of this area was in Downtown or along the Mississippi River, near where the bridge collapse site was. Shortly after the collapse, USI Wireless opened up the network to anyone (not just subscribers) and hastily added more wireless transmitters to the area to give additional speed to the network. With cell phone service overwhelmed in just 30 minutes, it was Caldwell's goal that people would use smartphones to communicate via the network instead. Whether or not voice communications traffic jumped in that period was unclear, but the network's usage did expand from 1,000 users before the collapse to 6,000 afterwards.

The network was also used heavily by government officials and rescue personnel, who used PDAs or laptops to log on to the network. It was used by rescue workers who were floating in the middle of the river and who could receive the signal to communicate with the headquarters in charge of the rescue operations. The wireless service was integral in sending large GIS files to the scene for rescuers to use in locating survivors. It was also utilized by the Minnesota Department of Transportation, the American Red Cross, and media outlets, both local and national. Retroactively, various Minneapolis officials deemed the presence of the network essential to the success of the response to the collapse.

== Reception ==
In a report on municipal wireless networks by The Wall Street Journal, Minneapolis's was singled out as being "a success story", with the publication explaining that the concept of having the city as the anchor tenant was a good one. The article cited the wireless network in Philadelphia that was being set up around the same time that Minneapolis's was, but was being run and built by EarthLink, the other finalist in the bidding process to select a network for Minneapolis. EarthLink had relinquished control of its partially complete network in 2008, in part due to a low subscription rate of only 5,000 customers in May of that year. Minneapolis, meanwhile, had 10,000 subscribers, and the network was nearing completion. In reference to the variety of stalled or failed wireless projects across the country, PC World cited USI Wireless as "the only firm that got the numbers and engineering to add up for them so far." A 2009 article in Computerworld noted that "Minneapolis is one of the few large cities that has deployed Wi-Fi successfully." The wireless network was tested in December 2007 by wireless testing firm Novarum, and was found to be the fastest metro wireless internet network in America.

The network received the W2i Digital Cities Wireless Communities Best Practices Award in 2007.
