= Boston Millennia Partners =

- Company type: Private ownership
- Industry: Private equity
- Predecessor: Boston Capital Ventures
- Founded: 1982; 44 years ago
- Headquarters: Boston, Massachusetts, United States
- Products: Venture capital
- Total assets: $750M
- Website: www.bmpvc.com

Boston Millennia Partners is a venture capital firm that provides private equity financing to high growth companies in the healthcare and business services industries. The firm is based in Boston, Massachusetts and was formed in 1997 when the founding partners spun out of Boston Capital Ventures to create Boston Millennia Partners. The managers have organized nine separate investment partnerships. Boston Millennia Partners’ investors include institutions, corporate pension programs, as well as non-profit foundations and high-net-worth family offices.

The managers have completed over 100 individual investments and 300 add-on acquisitions over twenty years. Investments include PAREXEL International (PRXL), GlycoFi (acquired by Merck), Ilex (ILXO, acquired by Genzyme), Bright Horizons (BFAM), Verio Inc. (VRIO, acquired by NTT), Odyssey Logistics, Arthrosurface, Athenix (acquired by Bayer CropScience), P&H Solutions (acquired by ACI Worldwide), Nexidia, Inc., MedAptus, Inc., and Hotjobs.com (HOTJ, acquired by Yahoo!).
