= Kent Ertugrul =

American executive

Kent Ertugrul was interim chairman of the board and chief executive officer (CEO) of Phorm Inc., a Delaware corporation. He resigned from the Phorm Corporation board on 15 July 2015. Phorm ceased trading on 14 April 2016, having burnt through £200 million of investors' capital.

== Early career ==
Ertugrul began his career in investment banking, working at J.P. Morgan, Credit Suisse First Boston and Morgan Stanley in London, helping to develop and distribute Inflation Linked Floating Rate Securities. Later, as Director and Chief Financial Officer, he oversaw the growth of Compass Technology as it became a leading PC-based voice mail company in the US. In 1991, Compass merged with California-based Octel Communications, which in turn was acquired by Lucent Technologies.

=== MiGs, Etc. ===
In 1990, Ertugrul was introduced to a MiG test pilot. The pilot offered Ertugrul a test flight, and from that flight, MiGs, Etc. was born - a joint venture with the Russian Air Force and the Russian Space Agency, which offered joy rides to tourists in Mig-29 jet fighters. Ertugrul put a one-inch-square advert in The Wall Street Journal which read "Fly a MiG 29 over Moscow." The company was inundated with 450 press inquiries within 24 hours, gaining worldwide media attention for commercializing the end of the Cold War. Later, Ertugrul founded Life.com, a desktop software and online interactive diary, as well as Voxster, a company enabling Instant Messaging for email.

== Phorm ==
In 2002, Ertugrul founded the company that would become Phorm, Inc. He served as Phorm’s interim chairman of the board and chief executive officer. Phorm is an Internet personalization technology company with offices in Europe, South America, Asia and the United States. Phorm partners with ISPs, publishers and advertisers to bring behaviorally targeted advertising and content to opted-in users of its service. The company was originally known as 121Media, Inc., but changed its name to Phorm, Inc. in 2007.

121Media, founded in 2002, produced a spyware application called PeopleOnPage. This application acted as a browser hijacker and passed details of the user's currently visited website to central ContextPlus servers, so that the user could be targeted with advertising. The adware component was called AproposMedia. AproposMedia is described by InternetSecurityZone.com as "...a malicious executable program that is usually installed without user consent or knowledge. AproposMedia may have the ability to secretly monitor, record, and transmit computer activity."

The company finally closed down in 2016, having lost millions of dollars for its shareholders during its period of operation.

== Education ==
Ertugrul attended St Paul's School, London and holds a bachelor's degree in politics from Princeton University.
