= Tropos Networks =

Wireless mesh networking company

- Type: Private
- Industry: Smart Grid, Wireless Networks
- Founded: 2000
- Fate: Acquired by ABB Group
- Headquarters: Sunnyvale, California; United States,
- Key people: Tom Ayers, President and CEO; Narasimha Chari, Co-Founder and CTO
- Products: Wireless Mesh Routers, Wireless Network Management

Tropos Networks is a wireless mesh networking company that provides hardware, embedded software and network management application software for building large scale wireless networks. These networks are used by utilities, municipalities, public safety agencies, mines and others that need to communicate with fixed and mobile assets, as well as mobile workers, in the field. The company was founded in 2000 by Narasimha Chari, Devabhaktuni "Sri" Srikrishna, Christian Dubiel and Jonathan Goldenstein. It is headquartered in Sunnyvale, California. In June 2012, it was acquired by ABB Power Grids Group, now Hitachi Energy.

== Customers ==
Tropos has more than 850 customers in more than 50 countries around the world. The company's customer base is concentrated in the smart grid, municipal government, public safety and open pit mining vertical markets. Notable customers include Avista, Glendale Water & Power, Duncan, Oklahoma, and Lafayette Utilities System.

== Investors and corporate governance ==
Tropos Networks is a privately held company. Venture investors include Benchmark Capital, Boston Millennia Partners, Cipio Partners, Duff Ackerman & Goodrich, Hanna Ventures, Integral Capital Partners and Voyager Capital. The Chairman of the Board of Directors is David Hanna of Hanna Ventures; board members include Curtis Feeny of Voyager Capital, Bill Gurley of Benchmark Capital and Tom Ayers, president and CEO of Tropos Networks. Tropos Network has been acquired by ABB Power Grids group in June 2012 now part of the Hitachi Energy portfolio.

== Technology ==
Utilities deploying a smart grid use Tropos for building a regional-scale distribution area communications networks covering hundreds to thousands of square miles. Tropos provides private IP broadband wireless networks that create a foundation upon which multiple smart grid applications including distribution automation, substation security, and advanced metering infrastructure (AMI) can be deployed.

Additionally, Tropos technology is employed by municipalities to improve efficiencies of a broad range of city services including Intelligent Transportation Systems, automated meter reading (AMR), public safety, and video surveillance.

Tropos has been awarded 40 patents.
