= Suneet Singh Tuli =

Co-founder of DataWind

- Born: 1968 (age 57–58)
- Citizenship: Canadian
- Education: Civil Engineering Graduate
- Alma mater: University of Toronto
- Occupation: Enterpreuner
- Organization: Datawind
- Notable work: Founder of Datawind and other companies, Ubislate Tablets, Aakash (tablet) Tablet
- Awards: 18 patents
- Website: http://datawind.com; http://ubislate.com

Suneet Singh Tuli is the co-founder of DataWind. He was born in 1968 to Lakhvir Singh, the head of an entrepreneurial Sikh family. He graduated from the University of Toronto in 1990 in Applied Sciences in Engineering. As a student he started working In his brother Raja Tuli's entrepreneurial firm, Widekom. He developed the objective of developing sales of large size fax machines. His machines were recorded in the Guinness Book of World Records.

In his second venture, he created battery-operated handheld printers and hand-held scanners for DocuPort Company. These two companies were among the first formed by people of Indian origin to IPO on NASDAQ. Most recently, Datawind's Aakash/Ubislate tablets attracted attention due to its affordable price.

== Recognition ==
- Suneet Singh Tuli has been recognised by Forbes Magazine in its 2012 Impact 15 list as a Classroom Revolutionary
- At the launch of Aakash 2 tablet UN Secretary General Ban Ki-moon spoke about the product's ability to transform people's lives, in educating and empowering the poor with internet and computing access.
- In 2012, he and his brother received a technology achievement award from the Indo-Canadian Chamber of Commerce.
- Chief Khalsa Dewan honoured him on 65th and 66th World Sikh educational conference (2014, 2016)
- Entrepreuner of the Year at World Sikh awards (20120.
