= One Laptop per Child =

Non-profit educational technology initiative

One Laptop Per Child
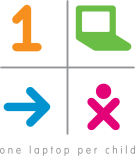
- Formation: January 28, 2005; 21 years ago
- Type: Non-profit
- Headquarters: Miami, Florida, U.S.
- Official language: Multilingual
- Founder: Nicholas Negroponte
- Key people: Seymour Papert; Mary Lou Jepsen; Alan Kay
- Website: laptop.org

One Laptop per Child (OLPC) was a non-profit initiative that operated from 2005 to 2014 with the goal of transforming education for children around the world by creating and distributing educational devices for the developing world, and by creating software and content for those devices.

When the program launched, the typical retail price for a laptop was considerably in excess of $1,000 (US), so achieving this objective required bringing a low-cost machine to production. This became the OLPC XO Laptop, a low-cost and low-power laptop computer. The housing was styled by Yves Béhar with Continuum, now EPAM Continuum. The project was originally funded by member organizations such as AMD, eBay, Google, Marvell Technology Group, News Corporation, and Nortel. Chi Mei Corporation, Red Hat, and Quanta provided in-kind support. After disappointing sales, the hardware design part of the organization shut down in 2014.

The OLPC project was praised for pioneering low-cost, low-power laptops and inspiring later variants such as Eee PCs and Chromebooks; for assuring consensus at ministerial level in many countries that computer literacy is a mainstream part of education; for creating interfaces that worked without literacy in any language, and particularly without literacy in English.

It was criticized for its US-centric focus ignoring bigger problems, high total costs, low focus on maintainability and training and its limited success. A large-scale randomized study of 531 primary schools in rural Peru over 10 years found no significant effects on academic performance, primary and secondary completion, or university enrollment. The OLPC project is critically reviewed in a 2019 MIT Press book titled The Charisma Machine: The Life, Death, and Legacy of One Laptop per Child.

OLPC, Inc, a descendant of the original organization, continues to operate, but the design and creation of laptops is no longer part of its mission.

== History ==
A short video covering OLPC's main mission principles

Thank You from the Children of OLPC

The OLPC program has its roots in the pedagogy of Seymour Papert, an approach known as constructionism, which espoused providing computers for children at early ages to enable full digital literacy. Papert and Nicholas Negroponte were at the MIT Media Lab from its inception. Papert compared the old practice of putting computers in a computer lab to books chained to the walls in old libraries. Negroponte likened shared computers to shared pencils. However, this pattern seemed to be inevitable, given the then-high prices of computers (over $1,500 apiece for a typical laptop or small desktop by 2004).

In 2005, Negroponte spoke at the World Economic Forum, in Davos. In this talk he urged industry to solve the problem, to enable a $100 laptop, which would enable constructionist learning, would revolutionize education, and would bring the world's knowledge to all children. He brought a mock-up and was described as prowling the halls and corridors of Davos to whip up support. Despite the reported skepticism of Bill Gates and others, Negroponte left Davos with committed interest from AMD, News Corp, and with strong indications of support from many other firms. From the outset, it was clear that Negroponte thought that the key to reducing the cost of the laptop was to reduce the cost of the display. Thus, when, upon return from Davos, he met Mary Lou Jepsen, the display pioneer who was in early 2005 joining the MIT Media Lab faculty, the discussions turned quickly to display innovation to enable a low-cost laptop. Convinced that the project was now possible, Negroponte led the creation of the first corporation for this: the Hundred Dollar Laptop Corp.

At the 2006 Wikimania, Jimmy Wales announced that the One Laptop Per Child Project would be including Wikipedia as the first element in their content repository. Wales explained, "I think it is in my rational self interest to care about what happens to kids in Africa," elaborating in his fundraising appeal:

I'm doing this for the child in Africa who is going to use free textbooks and reference works produced by our community and find a solution to the crushing poverty that surrounds him. But for this child, a website on the Internet is not enough; we need to find ways to get our work to people in a form they can actually use. And I'm doing this for my own daughter, who I hope will grow up in a world where culture is free, not proprietary, where control of knowledge is in the hands of people everywhere, with basic works they can adopt, modify, and share freely without asking permission from anyone. We're already taking back the Internet. With your help, we can take back the world.

At the 2006 World Economic Forum in Davos, Switzerland, the United Nations Development Program (UNDP) announced it would back the laptop. UNDP released a statement saying they would work with OLPC to deliver "technology and resources to targeted schools in the least developed countries".

Starting in 2007, the Association managed development and logistics, and the Foundation managed fundraising such as the Give One Get One campaign ("G1G1").

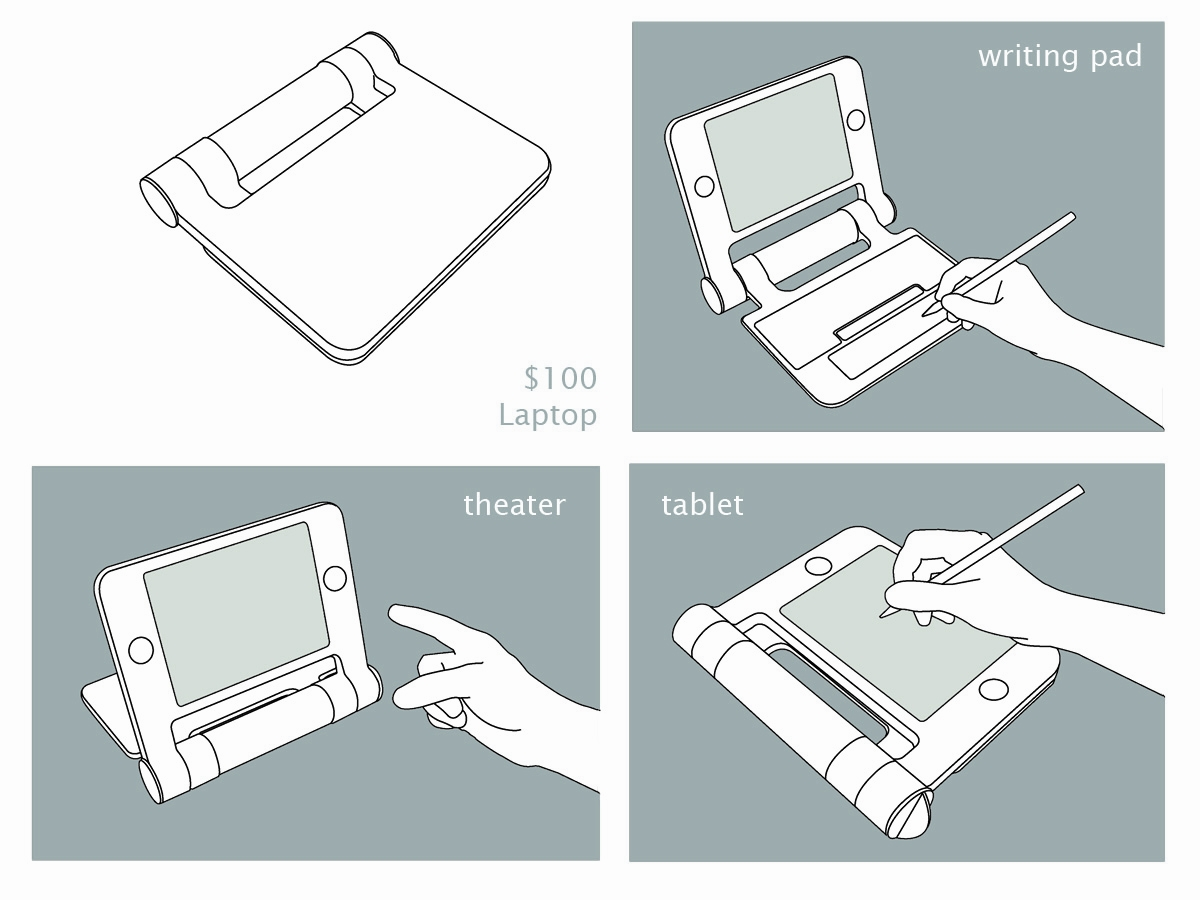
OLPC XO-1 original design proposal

Intel was a member of the association for a brief period in 2007. Shortly after OLPC's founder, Nicholas Negroponte, accused Intel of trying to destroy the non-profit, Intel joined the board with a mutual non-disparagement agreement between them and OLPC. Intel resigned its membership on January 3, 2008, citing disagreements with requests from Negroponte for Intel to stop dumping their Classmate PCs.

In 2008, Negroponte showed some doubt about the exclusive use of open-source software for the project, and made suggestions supporting a move towards adding Windows XP, which Microsoft was in the process of porting over to the XO hardware. Microsoft's Windows XP, however, was not seen by some as a sustainable operating system. Microsoft announced that they would sell them Windows XP for $3 per XO. It would be offered as an option on XO-1 laptops and possibly be able to dual boot alongside Linux. In response, Walter Bender, who was the former President of Software and Content for the OLPC project, left OLPC and founded Sugar Labs to continue development of the open source Sugar software which had been developed within OLPC. No significant deployments elected to purchase Windows licenses.

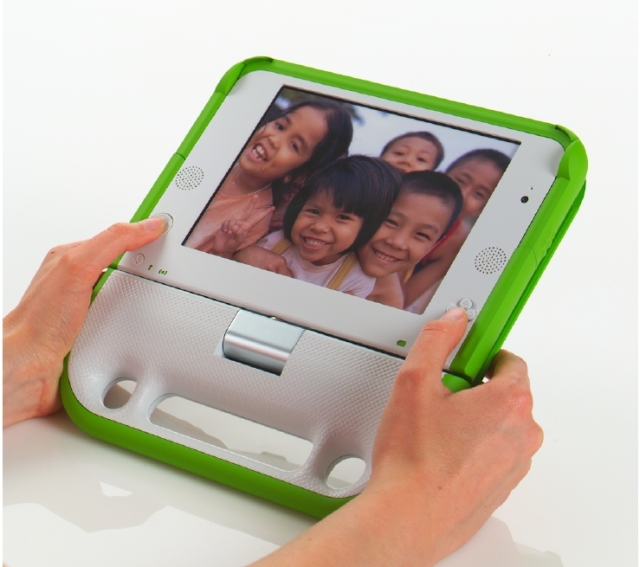
OLPC XO-1 laptop in e-book mode

Charles Kane became the new President and Chief Operating Officer of the OLPC Association on May 2, 2008. In late 2008, the NYC Department of Education purchased some XO computers for use by New York schoolchildren.

Advertisements for OLPC began streaming on the video streaming website Hulu and others in 2008. One such ad has John Lennon advertising for OLPC, with an unknown voice actor redubbing over Lennon's voice.

In 2008, OLPC lost significant funding. Their annual budget was slashed from $12 million to $5 million which resulted in a restructuring on January 7, 2009. Development of the Sugar operating environment was moved entirely into the community, the Latin America support organization was spun out and staff reductions, including Jim Gettys, affected approximately 50% of the paid employees. The remaining 32 staff members also saw salary reductions. Despite the downsizing, OLPC continued development of the XO-1.5 laptops.

In 2010, OLPC moved its headquarters to Miami. The Miami office oversaw sales and support for the XO-1.5 laptop and its successors, including the XO Laptop version 4.0 and the OLPC Laptop. Funding from Marvell, finalized in May 2010, revitalized the foundation and enabled the 1Q 2012 completion of the ARM-based XO-1.75 laptops and initial prototypes of the XO-3 tablets. OLPC took orders for mass production of the XO 4.0, and shipped over 3 million XO Laptops to children around the world.

== Criticism ==
At the World Summit on the Information Society held by the United Nations in Tunisia from November 16–18, 2005, several African representatives, most notably Marthe Dansokho (a missionary of United Methodist Church), voiced criticism towards the motives of the OLPC project and claimed that the project presented solutions for misplaced priorities, stating that African women would not have enough time to research new crops to grow. She added that clean water and schools were more important. Mohammed Diop specifically criticized the project as an attempt to exploit the governments of poor nations by making them pay for hundreds of millions of machines and the need of further investments into internet infrastructure. Others have similarly criticized laptop deployments in very low income countries, regarding them as cost-ineffective when compared to far simpler measures such as deworming and other expenses on basic child health.

Lee Felsenstein, a computer engineer who played a central role in the development of the personal computer, criticized the centralized, top-down design and distribution of the OLPC.

In September 2009, Alanna Shaikh offered a eulogy for the project at UN Dispatch, stating "It's time to call a spade a spade. OLPC was a failure."

A 2012 NPR report on OLPC's implementation in Peru found that while the laptops generated enthusiasm and improved digital familiarity among students, academic researchers observed little to no measurable improvement in math or reading scores. The report also highlighted issues with program oversight and limited teacher training in some regions.

In 2026, The Digital Delusion, a book by Jared Cooney Horvath, inspired many U.S. parents and school officials to reassess the use of laptops and tablets in classrooms. When one North Carolina school district experimented with "tech-free" Tuesdays and Thursdays, teachers reported that students were more engaged.

=== Cost ===
The project originally aimed for a price of 100 US dollars. In May 2006, Negroponte told the Red Hat's annual user summit: "It is a floating price. We are a nonprofit organization. We have a target of $100 by 2008, but probably it will be $135, maybe $140." A BBC news article in April 2010 indicated the price still remained above $200.

In April 2011, the price remained above $209. In 2013, more than 10% of the world population lived on less than US$2 per day. The latter income segment would have to spend more than a quarter of its annual income to purchase a single laptop, while the global average of Information and communications technology (ICT) spending is 3% of income. Empirical studies show that the borderline between ICT as a necessity good and ICT as a luxury good is roughly around the "magical number" of US$10 per person per month, or US$120 per year.

John Wood, founder of Room to Read (a non-profit which builds schools and libraries), emphasizes affordability and scalability over high-tech solutions. While in favor of the One Laptop per Child initiative for providing education to children in the developing world at a cheaper rate, he has pointed out that a $2,000 library can serve 400 children, costing just $5 a child to bring access to a wide range of books in the local languages (such as Khmer or Nepali) and English; also, a $10,000 school can serve 400–500 children ($20–25 a child). According to Wood, these are more appropriate solutions for education in the dense forests of Vietnam or rural Cambodia.

The Scandinavian aid organization FAIR proposed setting up computer labs with recycled second-hand computers as a cheaper initial investment. Negroponte argued against this proposition, stating the expensive running cost of conventional laptops. Computer Aid International doubted the OLPC sales strategy would succeed, citing the "untested" nature of its technology. CAI refurbishes computers and printers and sells them to developing countries for £42 a piece (compare it to £50 a piece for the OLPC laptops).

=== Teacher training and ongoing support ===
The OLPC project has been criticized for allegedly adopting a "one-shot" deployment approach with little or no technical support or teacher training, and for neglecting pilot programs and formal assessment of outcomes in favor of quick deployment. Some authors attribute this unconventional approach to the promoters' alleged focus on constructivist education and digital utopianism. Mark Warschauer, a Professor of University of California at Irvine and Morgan Ames, at the time of writing, a PhD candidate at Stanford University, pointed out that the laptop by itself does not completely fill the need of students in underprivileged countries. The "children's machines", as they have been called, have been deployed to several countries, for example Uruguay, Peru, and in the US, Alabama, but after a relatively short time, their usage declined considerably, sometimes because of hardware problems or breakage, in some cases, as high as 27–59% within the first two years, and sometimes due to a lack of knowledge on the part of the users on how to take full advantage of the machine.

However, another factor has recently been acknowledged: a lack of a direct relation to the pedagogy needed in the local context to be truly effective. Uruguay reports that only 21.5% of teachers use the laptop in the classroom on a daily basis, and 25% report using it less than once a week. In Alabama, 80.3% of students say they never or seldom use the computer for class work, and Peru, teachers report that in the first few months, 68.9% use the laptop three times per week, but after two months, only 40% report such usage. Those of a low socio-economic level tend to not be able to effectively use the laptop for educational purposes on their own, but with scaffolding and mentoring from teachers, the machine can become more useful. According to one of the returning OLPC executives, Walter Bender, the approach needs to be more holistic, combining technology with a prolonged community effort, teacher training and local educational efforts and insights.

The organization has been accused of simply giving underprivileged children laptops and "walking away". Some critics claim this "drive-by" implementation model was the official strategy of the project. While the organisation has learning teams dedicated to support and working with teachers, Negroponte has said in response to this criticism that "You actually can" give children a connected laptop and walk away, noting experiences with self-guided learning.

Other explanations of failure included a high minimum order, low reliability and maintainability, unsuitability to local conditions and culture, and encouragement of children to learn new ways of thinking instead of remaining loyal to old ways.

== Technology ==
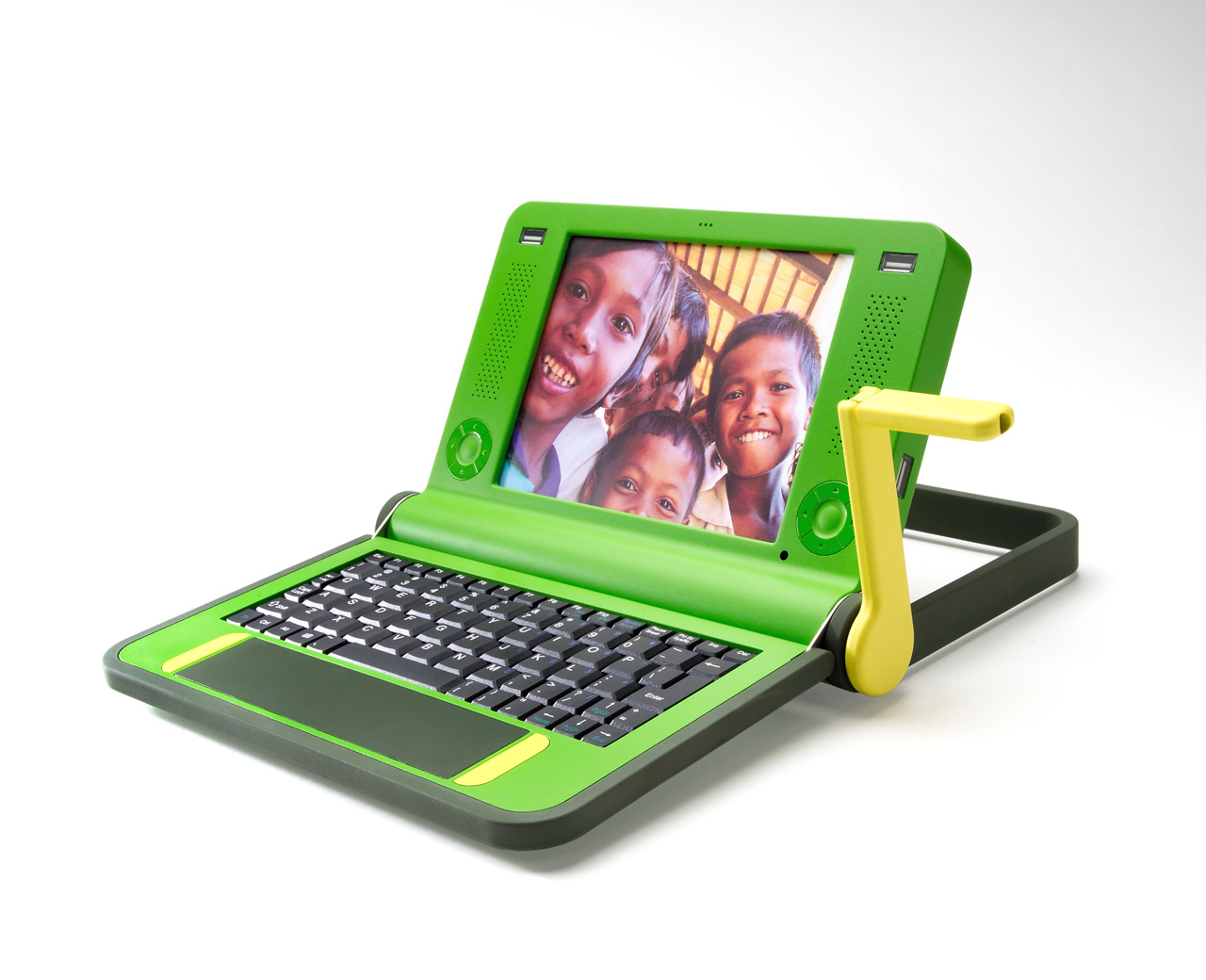
A second generation prototype came with a crank that proved unviable.

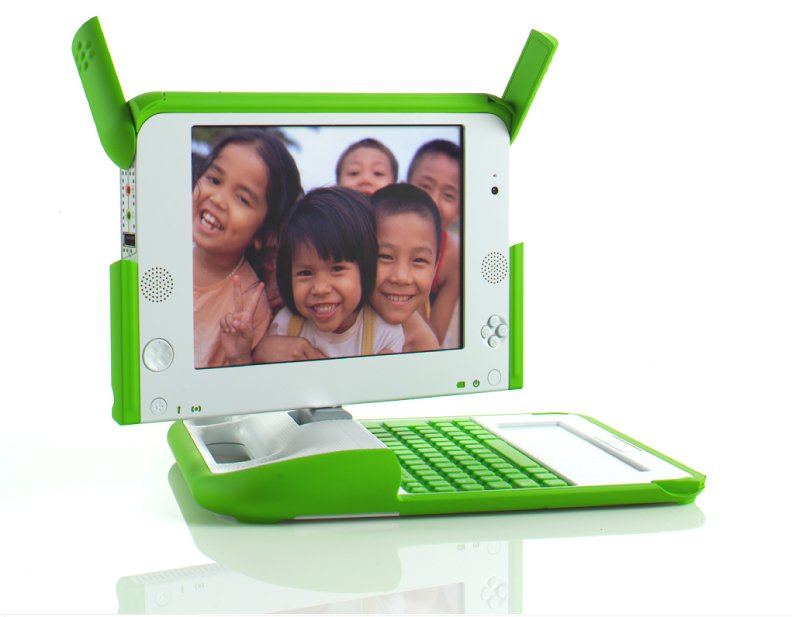
OLPC XO-1 laptop

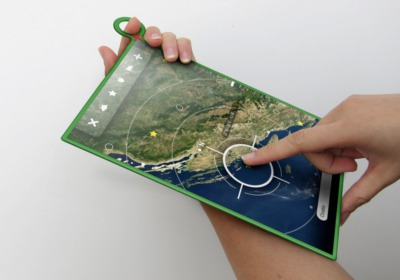
XO-3 concept

The XO, previously known as the "$100 Laptop" or "Children's Machine", is an inexpensive laptop computer designed to be distributed to children in developing countries around the world, to provide them with access to knowledge, and opportunities to "explore, experiment and express themselves" (constructionist learning). The laptop was styled by Yves Béhar with Design Continuum, while its technical architecture and design were created by a team led by Mary Lou Jepsen. The devices were manufactured by the Taiwanese computer company Quanta Computer.

The rugged, low-power computers use flash memory instead of a hard drive, run a Fedora-based operating system and use the SugarLabs Sugar user interface. Mobile ad hoc networking based on the 802.11s wireless mesh network protocol allows students to collaborate on activities and to share Internet access from one connection. The wireless networking has much greater range than typical consumer laptops. The XO-1 was designed for lower cost and much longer life than typical laptops.

In 2009, OLPC announced an updated XO (dubbed XO-1.5) to take advantage of the latest component technologies. The XO-1.5 includes a new VIA C7-M processor and a new chipset providing a 3D graphics engine and an HD video decoder. It has 1 GB of RAM and built-in storage of 4 GB, with an option for 8 GB. The XO-1.5 uses the same display, and a network wireless interface with half the power dissipation.

Early prototype versions of the hardware were available in June 2009, and they were available for software development and testing available for free through a developer's program.

An XO-1.75 model was developed that used a Marvell ARM processor, targeting a price below $150 and date in 2011.

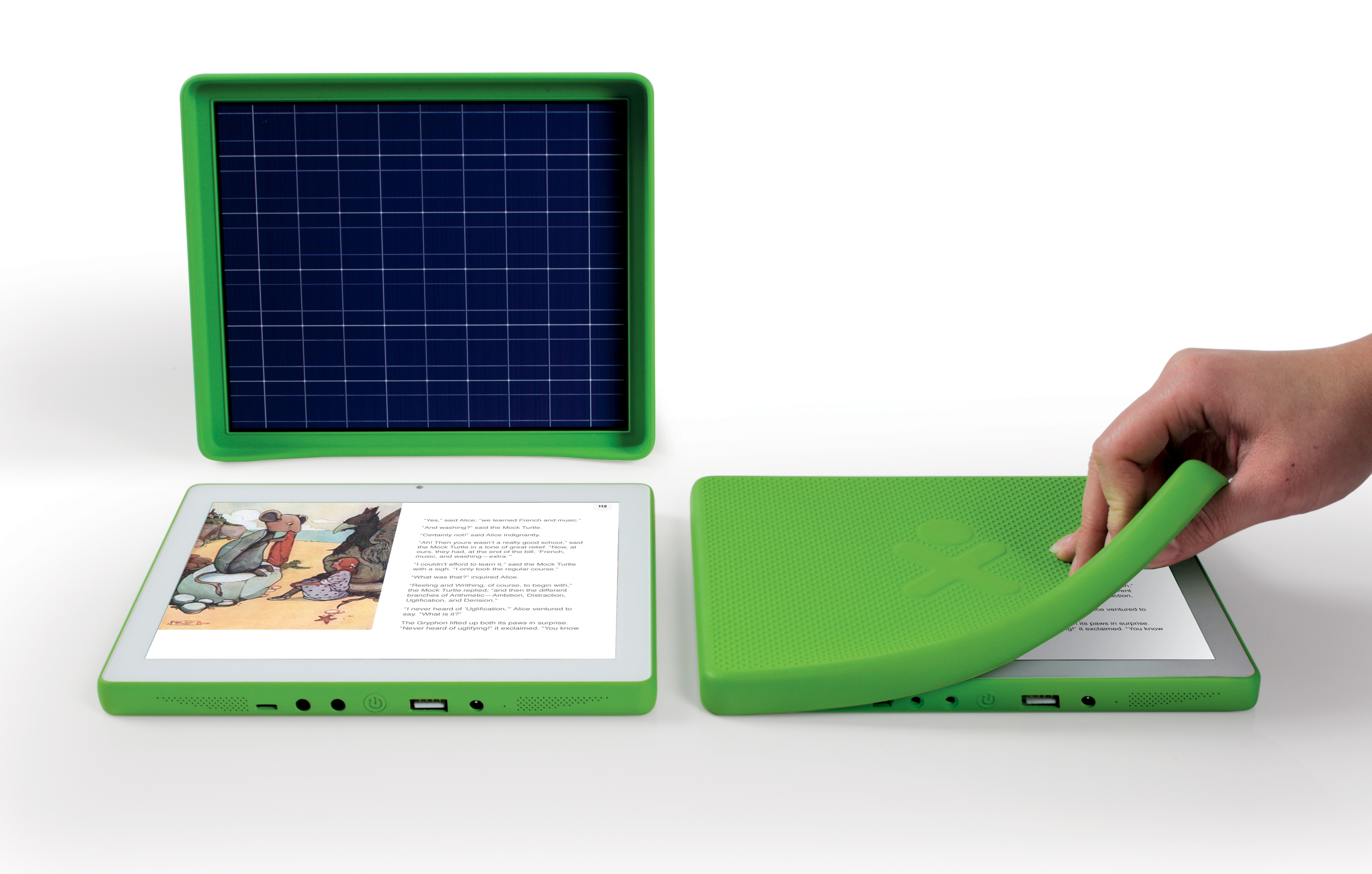
XO-3 production model

The XO-2 two sheet design concept was canceled in favor of the one sheet XO-3.

An XO-3 concept resembled a tablet computer and was planned to have the inner workings of the XO 1.75. Price goal was below $100 and date was 2012.

As of May 2010, OLPC was working with Marvell on other unspecified future tablet designs. In October 2010, both OLPC and Marvell signed an agreement granting OLPC $5.6 million to fund development of its XO-3 next generation tablet computer. The tablet was to use an ARM chip from Marvell.

At CES 2012, OLPC showcased the XO-3 model, which featured a touchscreen and a modified form of SugarLabs "Sugar". In early December 2012, however, it was announced that the XO-3 would not be seeing actual production, and focus had shifted to the XO-4.

The XO-4 was launched at International CES 2013 in Las Vegas The XO Laptop version 4 is available in two models: XO 4 and XO 4 Touch, with the latter providing multi-touch input on the display. The XO Laptop version 4 uses an ARM processor to provide high performance with low power consumption, while keeping the industrial design of the traditional XO Laptop.

=== Software ===
The laptops include an anti-theft system which can, optionally, require each laptop to periodically make contact with a server to renew its cryptographic lease token. If the cryptographic lease expires before the server is contacted, the laptop will be locked until a new token is provided. The contact may be to a country-specific server over a network or to a local, school-level server that has been manually loaded with cryptographic "lease" tokens that enable a laptop to run for days or even months between contacts. Cryptographic lease tokens can be supplied on a USB flash drive for non-networked schools. The mass production laptops are also tivoized, disallowing installation of additional software or replacement of the operating system. Users interested in development need to obtain the unlocking key separately (most developer laptops for Western users already come unlocked). It is claimed that locking prevents unintentional bricking and is part of the anti-theft system.

In 2006, the OLPC project was heavily criticised over Red Hat's non-disclosure agreement (NDA) with Marvell concerning the wireless device in OLPC, especially in light of the OLPC project being positioned as an open-source friendly initiative. An open letter for documentation was inked by Theo de Raadt (a recipient of the 2004 Award for the Advancement of Free Software), and the initiative for open documentation has been supported by Richard Stallman, the President of the Free Software Foundation. De Raadt later clarified that he finds an issue with OLPC having proprietary firmware files that are not allowed to be independently re-distributed (even in the binary form) by third-party operating systems like OpenBSD, as well as receiving no documentation to write the necessary drivers for the operating system. De Raadt has pointed out that the OpenBSD project requires no firmware source code, and no low-level documentation to work on firmware, only requiring the binary distribution rights and documentation to interface with the said binary firmware that runs outside of the main CPU, a quite simple request that is generally honoured by many other wireless device vendors like Ralink. Stallman fully agreed with de Raadt's request to open up the documentation, since Stallman is known to hold an even stronger and more idealistic position in regards to the proprietary components, and requires that even the firmware that runs outside of the main CPU must be provided in its source code form, something de Raadt does not require. De Raadt later has had to point out that such more idealistic and less realistic position has instead been misattributed to OpenBSD's more practical approach to make it look unreasonable, and stood on record that OpenBSD's position is much easier to satisfy, yet it nonetheless remained unresolved.

OLPC's dedication to "Free and open source" was questioned with their May 15, 2008, announcement that large-scale purchasers would be offered the choice to add an extra cost, special version of the proprietary Windows XP OS developed by Microsoft alongside the regular, free and open Linux-based operating system with the SugarLabs "Sugar OS" GUI. Microsoft developed a modified version of Windows XP and announced in May 2008 that Windows XP would be available for an additional cost of 10 dollars per laptop. James Utzschneider, from Microsoft, said that initially only one operating system could be chosen. OLPC, however, said that future OLPC work would enable XO-1 laptops to dual boot either the free and open Linux/Sugar OS or the proprietary Microsoft Windows XP. Negroponte further said that "OLPC will sell Linux-only and dual-boot, and will not sell Windows-only [XO-1 laptops]". OLPC released the first test firmware enabling XO-1 dual-boot on July 3, 2008. This option did not prove popular. As of 2011, a few pilots had received a few thousand total dual-boot machines, and the new ARM-based machines do not support Windows XP. No significant deployment purchased Windows licenses. Negroponte stated that the dispute had "become a distraction" for the project, and that its end goal was enabling children to learn, while constructionism and the open source ethos was more of a means to that end. Charles Kane concurred, stating that anything which detracted from the ultimate goal of widespread distribution and use was counterproductive.

=== Bugs ===
Jeff Patzer, who interned for One Laptop Per Child in Peru, said that teachers there are told to handle problems in one of two ways: if the problem is a software issue, they are to flash the computer, and if it is a hardware problem, they are to report it. He said that this blackboxing approach caused users to feel disconnected with and confused by the laptop, and often resulted in the laptops eventually going unused. Several defects in OLPC XO-1 hardware have emerged in the field, and laptop repair is often neglected by students or their families (who are responsible for maintenance) due to the relatively high cost of some components (such as displays).

On the software side, the Bitfrost security system has been known to deactivate improperly, rendering the laptop unusable until it is unlocked by support technicians with the proper keys (this is a time-consuming process, and the problem often affects large numbers of laptops at the same time). The Sugar interface has been difficult for teachers to learn, and the mesh networking feature in the OLPC XO-1 was buggy and went mostly unused in the field.

The OLPC XO-1 hardware lacks connectivity to external monitors or projectors, and teachers are not provided with software for remote assessment. As a result, students are unable to present their work to the whole class, and teachers must also assess students' work from the individual laptops. Teachers often find it difficult to use the keyboard and screen, which were designed with student use in mind.

=== Environmental impact ===
In 2005 and prior to the final design of the XO-1 hardware, OLPC received criticism because of concerns over the environmental and health impacts of hazardous materials found in most computers. The OLPC asserted that it aimed to use as many environmentally friendly materials as it could; that the laptop and all OLPC-supplied accessories would be fully compliant with the EU's Restriction of Hazardous Substances Directive (RoHS); and that the laptop would use an order of magnitude less power than the typical consumer netbooks available as of 2007 thus minimizing the environmental burden of power generation.

The final XO-1, as shipped in 2007, complied with the EU's RoHS and drew between 0.25 and 6.5 watts in operation. The Green Electronics Council's Electronic Product Environmental Assessment Tool (EPEAT) rated the XO-1 as non-toxic and fully recyclable, as well as longer-lasting, cheaper, and more energy efficient than contemporaries. The XO-1 notebook computer was the first laptop to be awarded an EPEAT Gold level rating.

=== Anonymity ===
Other discussions question whether OLPC laptops should be designed to promote anonymity or to facilitate government tracking of stolen laptops. A June 2008 New Scientist article critiqued Bitfrost's P_THEFT security option, which allows each laptop to be configured to transmit an individualized, non-repudiable digital signature to a central server at most once each day to remain functioning.

== Distribution ==
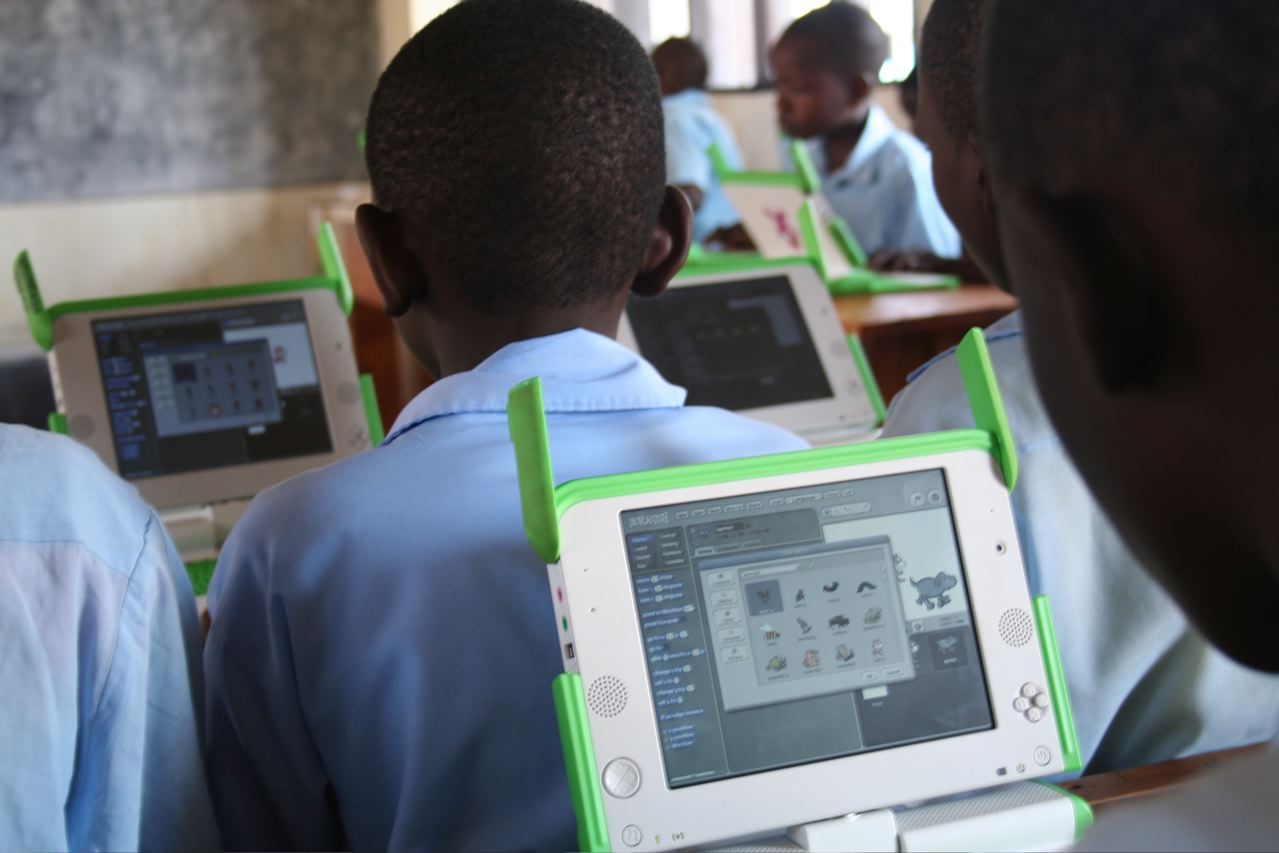
At a primary school in Kigali, Rwanda, in 2009, running Scratch on OLPC school laptops

The laptops are sold to governments, to be distributed through the ministries of education with the goal of distributing "one laptop per child". The laptops are given to students, similar to school uniforms and ultimately remain the property of the child. The operating system and software is localized to the languages of the participating countries.

OLPC later worked directly with program sponsors from the public and private sectors to implement its educational program in entire schools and communities. As a non-profit organization, OLPC did require a source of funding for its program so that the laptops are given to students at no cost to child or to his/her family.

=== Early distributions ===
Approximately 500 developer boards (Alpha-1) were distributed in mid-2006; 875 working prototypes (Beta 1) were delivered in late 2006; 2400 "Beta 2" machines were distributed at the end of February 2007; full-scale production started November 6, 2007. Around one million units were manufactured in 2008.

=== Give 1 Get 1 program ===
OLPC initially stated that no consumer version of the XO laptop was planned. The project, however, later established the laptopgiving.org website to accept direct donations and ran a "Give 1 Get 1" (G1G1) offer starting on November 12, 2007. The offer was initially scheduled to run for only two weeks, but was extended until December 31, 2007, to meet demand. With a donation of $399 (plus US$25 shipping cost) to the OLPC "Give 1 Get 1" program, donors received an XO-1 laptop of their own and OLPC sent another on their behalf to a child in a developing country. Shipments of "Get 1" laptops sent to donors were restricted to addresses within the United States, its territories, and Canada.

Some 83,500 people participated in the program. Delivery of all of the G1G1 laptops was completed by April 19, 2008. Delays were blamed on order fulfillment and shipment issues both within OLPC and with the outside contractors hired to manage those aspects of the G1G1 program.

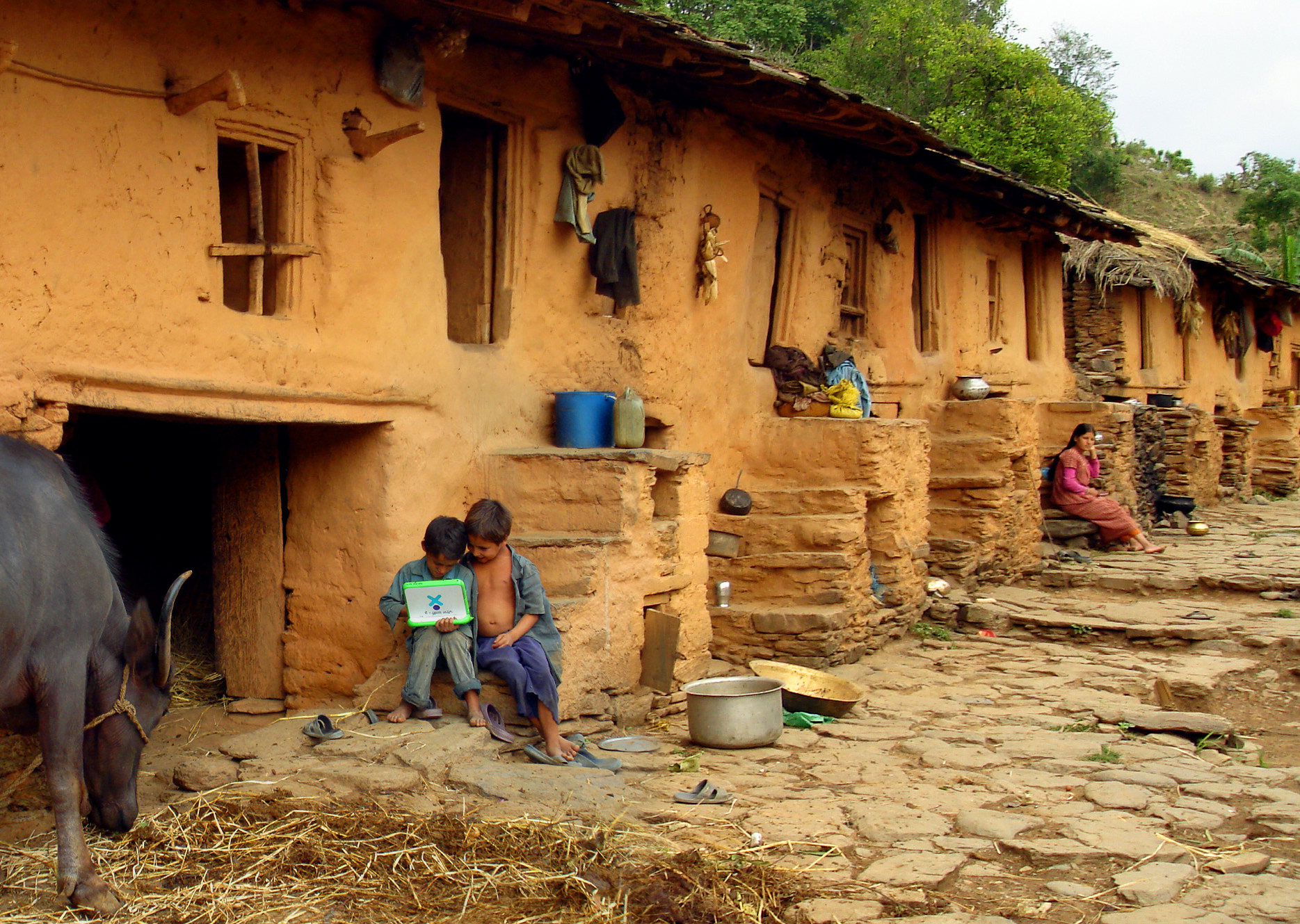
OLE Nepal, One Laptop Per Child image from Nepal

Between November 17 and December 31, 2008, a second G1G1 program was run through Amazon.com and Amazon.co.uk. This partnership was chosen specifically to solve the distribution issues of the G1G1 2007 program. The price to consumers was the same as in 2007, at US$399.

The program aimed to be available worldwide. Laptops could be delivered in the US, in Canada and in more than 30 European countries, as well as in some Central and South American countries (Colombia, Haiti, Peru, Uruguay, Paraguay), African countries (Ethiopia, Ghana, Nigeria, Madagascar, Rwanda) and Asian countries (Afghanistan, Georgia, Kazakhstan, Mongolia, Nepal). Despite this, the program sold only about 12,500 laptops and generated a mere $2.5 million, a 93 percent decline from the year before.

=== Laptop shipments ===
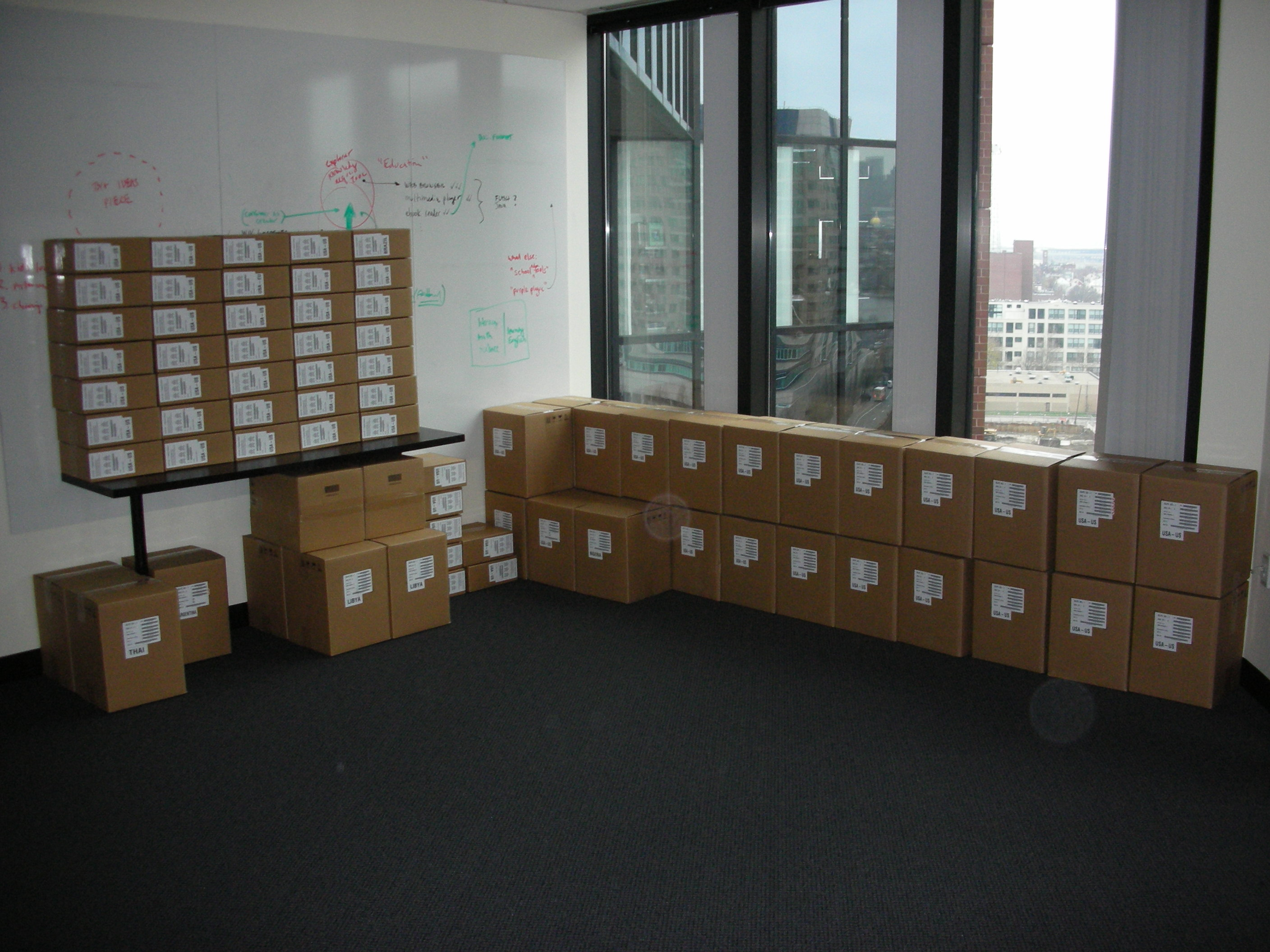
The first of shipment OLPC machines in Cambridge, Massachusetts

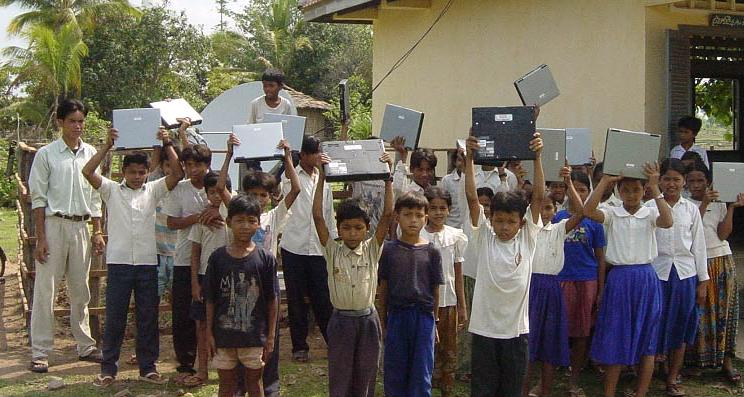
Children in a remote Cambodian school where a pilot laptop program has been in place since 2001

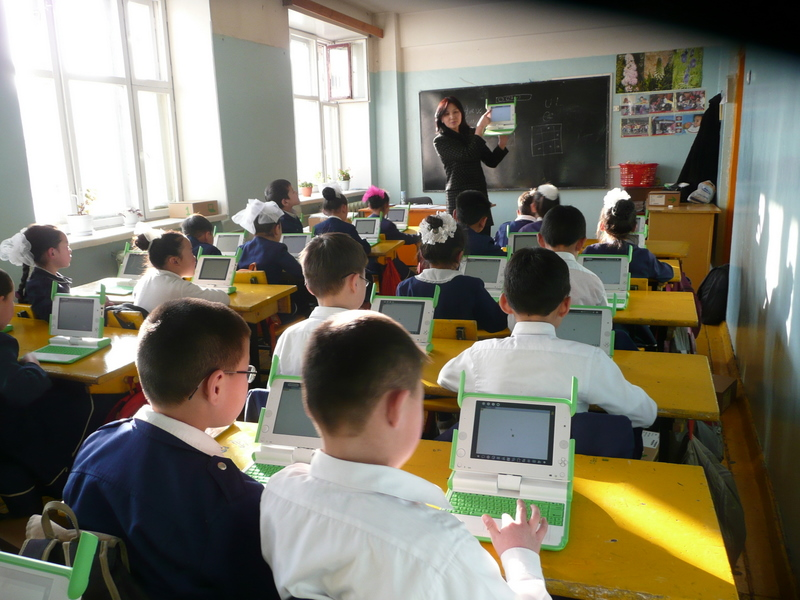
An OLPC class in Ulaanbaatar, Mongolia

As of 2015, OLPC reported that more than 3 million laptops had been shipped.

== Regional responses ==
=== Uruguay ===
In October 2007, Uruguay placed an order for 100,000 laptops, making Uruguay the first country to purchase a full order of laptops. The first real, non-pilot deployment of the OLPC technology happened in Uruguay in December 2007. Since then, 200,000 more laptops have been ordered to cover all public school children between 6 and 12 years old.

President Tabaré Vázquez of Uruguay presented the final laptop at a school in Montevideo on October 13, 2009. Over the last two years 362,000 pupils and 18,000 teachers have been involved, and has cost the state $260 (£159) per child, including maintenance costs, equipment repairs, training for the teachers and internet connection. The annual cost of maintaining the programme, including an information portal for pupils and teachers, will be US$21 (£13) per child.

The country reportedly became the first in the world where every primary school child received a free laptop on October 13, 2009 as part of the Plan Ceibal (Education Connect).

Even though roughly 35% of all OLPC computers went to Uruguay, a 2013 study by the Economics Institute (University of the Republic, Uruguay) of the Ceibal plan concluded that use of the laptops did not improve literacy and that the use of the laptops was mostly recreational, with only 4.1% of the laptops being used "all" or "most" days in 2012. The main conclusion was that the results showed no impact of the OLPC program on the test scores in reading and math. Still, more recent studies give an opposite view of the project's results, regarding it a success, like in the case of the 2020 publication by Broadband Commission for Sustainable Development.

=== Artsakh ===
On January 26, 2012, prime minister Ara Harutyunyan and entrepreneur Eduardo Eurnekian signed a memorandum of understanding launching an OLPC program in the now defunct Artsakh. The program was geared towards elementary schools throughout Artsakh. Eurnekian hoped to decrease the gap by giving the war-zoned region an opportunity to engage in a more solid education. The New York-based nonprofit Armenian General Benevolent Union helped to undertake the responsibility by providing on-the-ground support. The government of Artsakh was enthusiastic and worked with OLPC to bring the program to fruition.

=== Nigeria ===
Lagos Analysis Corp., also called Lancor, a Lagos, US-based Nigerian-owned company, sued OLPC in the end of 2007 for $20 million, claiming that the computer's keyboard design was stolen from a Lancor patented device. OLPC responded by claiming that they had not sold any multi-lingual keyboards in the design claimed by Lancor, and that Lancor had misrepresented and concealed material facts before the court. In January 2008, the Nigerian Federal Court rejected OLPC motion to dismiss LANCOR's lawsuit and extended its injunction against OLPC distributing its XO Laptops in Nigeria. OLPC appealed the Court's decision, the Appeal is still pending in the Nigerian Federal Court of Appeals. In March 2008, OLPC filed a lawsuit in Massachusetts to stop LANCOR from suing it in the United States. In October 2008, MIT News magazine erroneously reported that the Middlesex Superior Court granted OLPC's motions to dismiss all of LANCOR's claims against OLPC, Nicholas Negroponte, and Quanta. On October 22, 2010 OLPC voluntarily moved the Massachusetts Court to dismiss its own lawsuit against LANCOR.

In 2007, XO laptops in Nigeria were reported to contain pornographic material belonging to children participating in the OLPC Program. In response, OLPC Nigeria announced they would start equipping the machines with filters.

=== India ===
India's Ministry of Human Resource Development, in June 2006, rejected the initiative, saying "it would be impossible to justify an expenditure of this scale on a debatable scheme when public funds continue to be in inadequate supply for well-established needs listed in different policy documents". Later they stated plans to make laptops at $10 each for schoolchildren. Two designs submitted to the Ministry from a final year engineering student of Vellore Institute of Technology and a researcher from the Indian Institute of Science, Bangalore in May 2007 reportedly describe a laptop that could be produced for "$47 per laptop" for even small volumes. The Ministry announced in July 2008 that the cost of their proposed "$10 laptop" would in fact be $100 by the time the laptop became available. In 2010, a related $35 Sakshat Tablet was unveiled in India, released the next year as the "Aakash". In 2011, each Aakash sold for approximately $44 by an Indian company, DataWind. DataWind plans to launch similar projects in Brazil, Egypt, Panama, Thailand and Turkey. OLPC later expressed support for the initiative.

In 2009, a number of states announced plans to order OLPCs. However, as of 2010, only the state of Manipur had deployed 1000 laptops.

== See also ==
- Child computer
- Computer literacy
- Digital divide
- Digital textbook
- Dynabook
- Educational technology in sub-Saharan Africa
- Simputer
- Universal access to education
- Web (2013 film)
- World Computer Exchange
- White saviour complex
