= Classpad =

Android tablet computer

- Developer: Classteacher Learning Systems
- Manufacturer: Classteacher Learning Systems
- Type: Educational tablet-media player-PC
- Released: December 2011
- Operating system: Android 4.0
- CPU: 1.2 GHz
- Memory: 8 GB (expandable up to 32 GB); 1 GB RAM
- Storage: Flash memory
- Sound: speaker
- Input: Touch screen
- Camera: 0.3 megapixel
- Connectivity: Wi-Fi 802.11b/g/n, USB and HDMI connection port
- Website: classpad.in

Classpad is an Android-based educational tablet computer from Classteacher Learning Systems.

== Features and specifications ==
The tablet comes with a version of the Android 4.0 operating system with some custom skins and applications provided by Classteacher Learning Systems.

Classpad, touted to be a competition for Aakash, the world's cheapest tablet, is conceptualised to customise education in a way that every student can be reached and participate in the process of learning. The Classpad claims a better battery life, 1.3 GHz processing speed and a built-in memory of 8 GB, which is expandable to 32 GB. The device is also equipped with artificial intelligence.

Students can enter text into the tablet with an on-screen keyboard.

The use of Classpads makes the teachers transfer class works to the students' tablets, share their own content instantly at ease, and conduct tests.
