= Construct Education =

American online professional education company

- Industry: Digital learning
- Founded: 2013; 12 years ago
- Founder: Carl Dawson and Krishan Meetoo
- Headquarters: Uckfield, United Kingdom
- Number of locations: 4
- Area served: Worldwide
- Key people: Denice Pitt (CEO)
- Services: Instructional Design, Learning Strategy, Course and Platform Migration, Digital learning course design and delivery
- Parent: Online Education Services (OES)
- Website: constructeducation.com

Construct Education is a British company providing digital learning and enablement which was founded by Krishan Meetoo and Carl Dawson in 2013.

Its services include instructional design and course delivery for digital courses and programs, and the company also has a media production team that designs graphics, creates animations, films, and does video editing for organizations investing in online learning.

Construct became a majority-owned subsidiary of OES in November 2020 but continued to operate under its own brand from its offices in the United States, United Kingdom, and South Africa.

In August 2025, Construct rebranded as OES Learning Solutions, which is effectively the OPX division of OES.

== History ==
- Construct Education was founded in November 2013 by two engineers from the automotive industry, Krishan Meetoo, and Carl Dawson.
- In November 2013, Carl Dawson and Krishan Meetoo start the company, originally named Proversity, at the Google Campus in the Silicon Roundabout in London.
- In January 2014 Proversity received initial support from the Young Foundation, an organization established by the founder of the Open University.
- In June 2014, Proversity received its first contract with the UK's rail authority, Network Rail, to deliver a program aimed at 70,000 learners across the whole of the rail sector in the United Kingdom.
- In July 2015, they established a US presence for the company in Boston, MA in partnership with MIT and Harvard
- In December 2015, Proversity closed a seed investment round with European Venture Capital company, RSBC, for $1.6 million.
- In January 2016, Proveristy opened offices in Cape Town and hired experienced professionals for Technology Development and Content Production.
- In March 2016, Proversity signed a partnership agreement with edX to support the rapidly expanding edX and Open edX communities.
- In May 2016, Proveristy started work on building online learning for Britain's biggest graduate employer, Teach First.
- In August 2017, Pro-bono delivery of a bespoke learning platform and program for The Paediatric AIDS Treatment for Africa (PATA) organization.
- In August 2018, the company's name was changed to Construct Education.
- In August 2019, Construct Education moved into its current offices in Cape Town and announced the growth of its team to over 100 people across their offices around the globe.
- In November 2020, Online Education Services (OES) acquired a Majority Stake in Construct Education.
- 31 January 2023, the OPM and online education enabler, OES, concluded its acquisition of Construct Education.
- On 1 August 2025, Construct introduced the OES Learning Solutions brand at InstructureCon 2025 and UPCEA SOLAR 2025.
