= Digital learning =

Learning supported by technology

Digital learning can be defined as a process of learning that is mediated, or supported, by digital technologies. These have different forms, including online learning, mobile learning, blended learning, and any educational software and available resources used in teaching and learning. The main aim of digital learning is to utilize technology to enhance accessibility, flexibility, and individualization of learning.

== Online learning ==
Online learning involves learning using the internet. Commonplace is for learners to learn using a Learning Management System, which provides teaching resources online. A number of companies provide such systems for educational institutes to use allowing learners to study online.

Digital learning has been developed significantly since the first attempts at computer-assisted instruction, to advanced online-based platforms and mobile programs.

== Digital Literacy in Education ==
Organizations such as Uncast and the International Society for Technology in Education (ISTE) promote digital literacy frameworks to direct educators and learners in developing the skills. The digital divide is a concern area as the level of socioeconomic status, geography, and disabilities come into play when it comes to getting access to technology and digital literacy training. Equal access to the internet and new techniques requires high-speed internet and digital tools to achieve this, equal distribution of digital tools and online capabilities.

== Implications of COVID-19 on digital learning ==
The COVID-19 pandemic led to a rush of unprecedented levels of digital learning around the world, both emphasizing the positive aspects of education technology and the inconsistencies of accessibility to devices and the internet, along with digital literacy. Some have argued that Covid 19 acted as a catalyst for the digital transformations in education. The use of learning technologies may have contributed to a diminished spreading spread of the virus.

There was an increase of mental health problems after Covid-19, especially with student stress. Digital learning was implemented into schools after the Covid-19 pandemic which led to an increase in stress, anxiety, and depression in students. A research study on student stress helped to form curriculum changes for when schools re-opened after the pandemic. The results showed digital learning increases student stress and is connected with mental health.

Outside of health related effects, e-learning enabled students to continue their studies even in unprecedented global conditions.

== Pedagogical Frameworks and Digital Literacy Integration ==
Digital learning is meant to enhance the learning experience rather than replace traditional methods altogether. To successfully incorporate digital tools into education, several frameworks developed by educators are in use: SAMR Model: Instructions for replenishing, extending, redesigning, and repurposing learning activities by using technology. PACK Framework: Places a high value on the synergy between three independent entities: technological knowledge, pedagogical knowledge, and content knowledge, which become critical for effective teaching. Triple E Framework: It emphasizes how technology has tasked students, served to develop the learning objectives, and learning beyond the school institutions. These models assist teachers in integrating digital literacies that enable them to make technology more than a substitute element in acquiring learning skills.

== See also ==
- Educational technology
- Education and Technology
- Online learning in higher education
- Online credentials for learning
- Digital credential
- Distance education
- MOOC
- Open educational resources
- Educational technology in sub-Saharan Africa
