= OLPC XO-3 =

Tablet computer

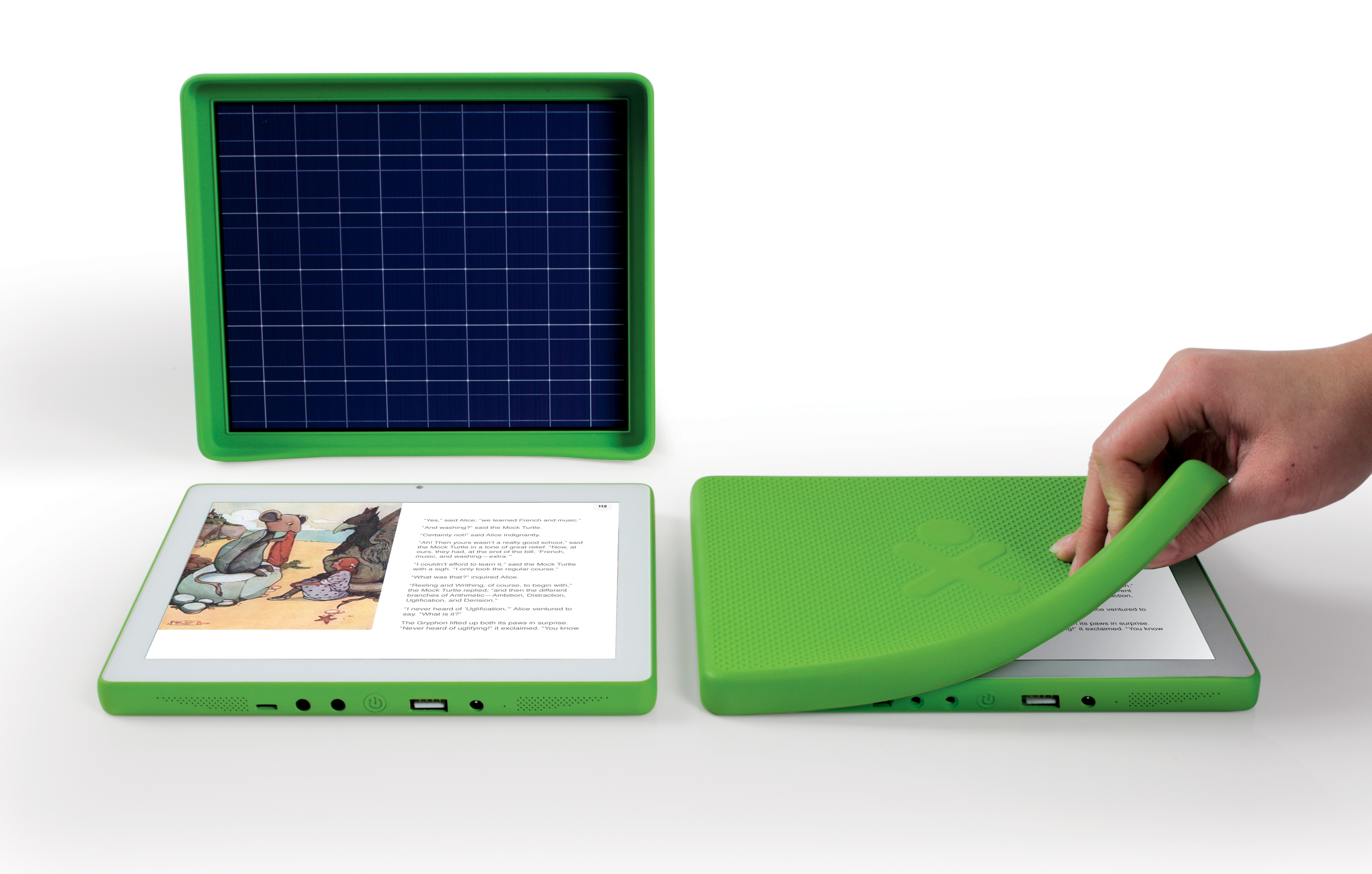
Production version of the XO-3

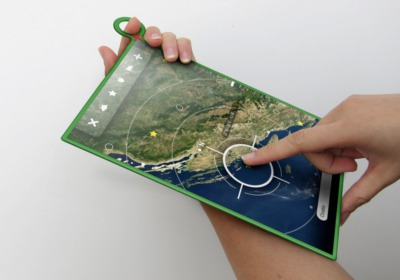
Concept version for XO-3

XO-3 was a design for a tablet/e-book reader intended to be developed under the One Laptop per Child (OLPC) initiative, but the project was cancelled in November 2012, replaced by the XO tablet.

== History ==
It was planned to have a tablet computer form factor over the canceled dual-screen design concept of the XO-2. The inner workings were those of the XO 1.75 together with the same ARM processor.

The XO-3 featured an 8-inch 4:3 1024 × 768-resolution display and used a Marvell Technology Group Marvell Armada PXA618 SoC. The XO-3 was intended to feature innovative charging options such as a hand crank or a solar panel.

The XO-3 tablet was planned to be released in 2012, for a target price below $100. The XO-3 and accompanying solar cell & handcrank power options were demoed at the International Consumer Electronics Show (CES) in January, 2012 as shown on BBC News technology programme Click.

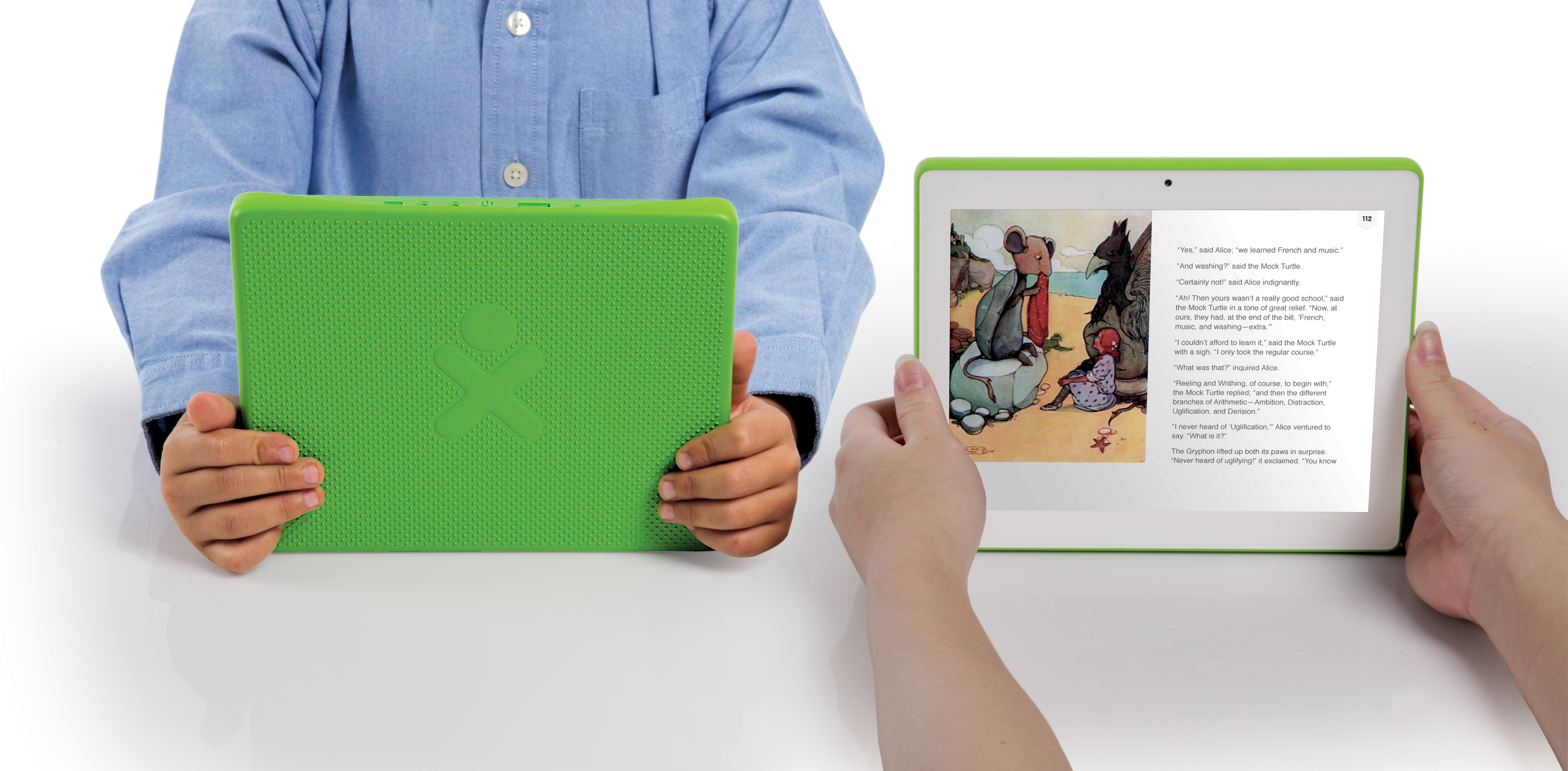
Front and back

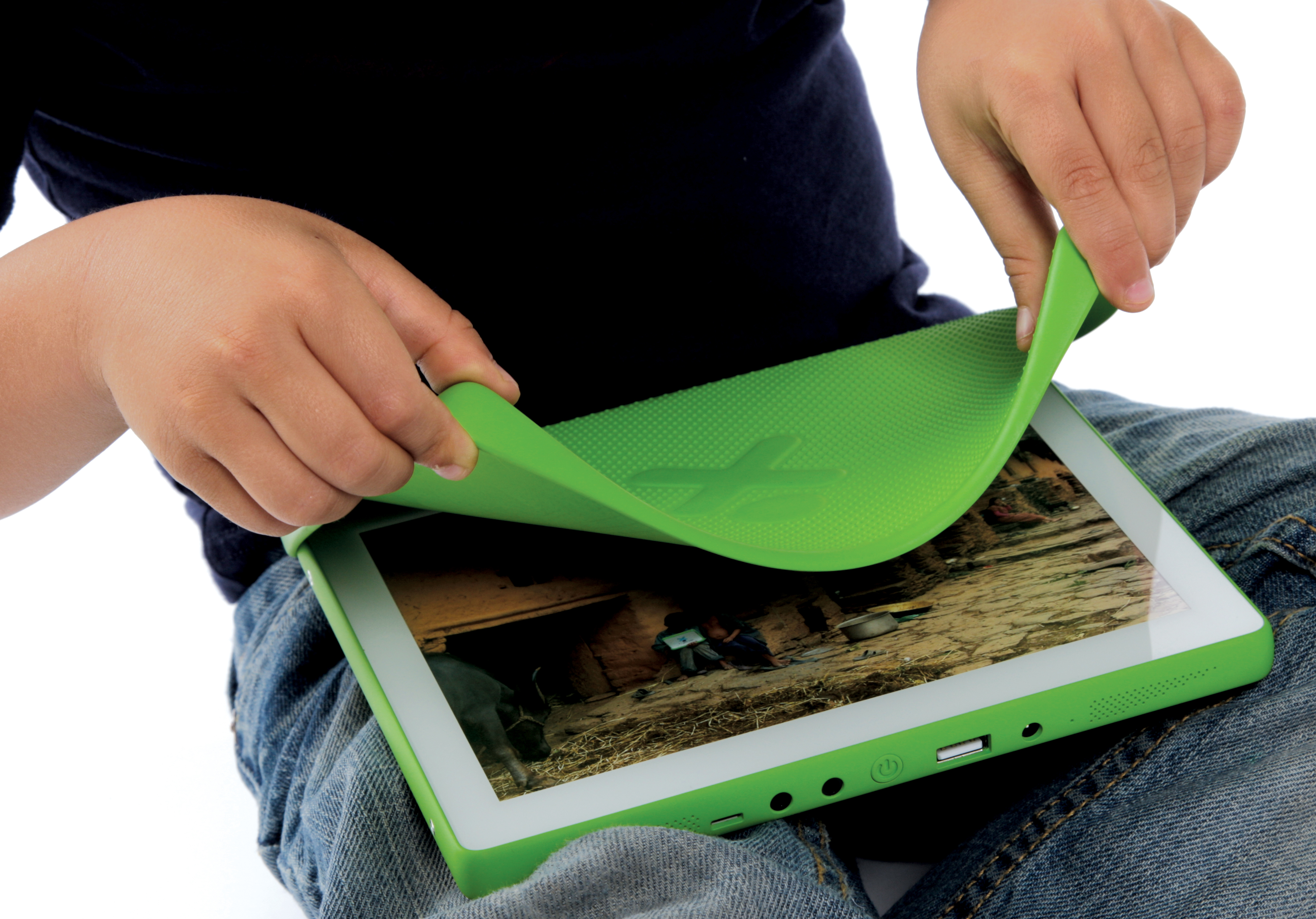
Flexible cover

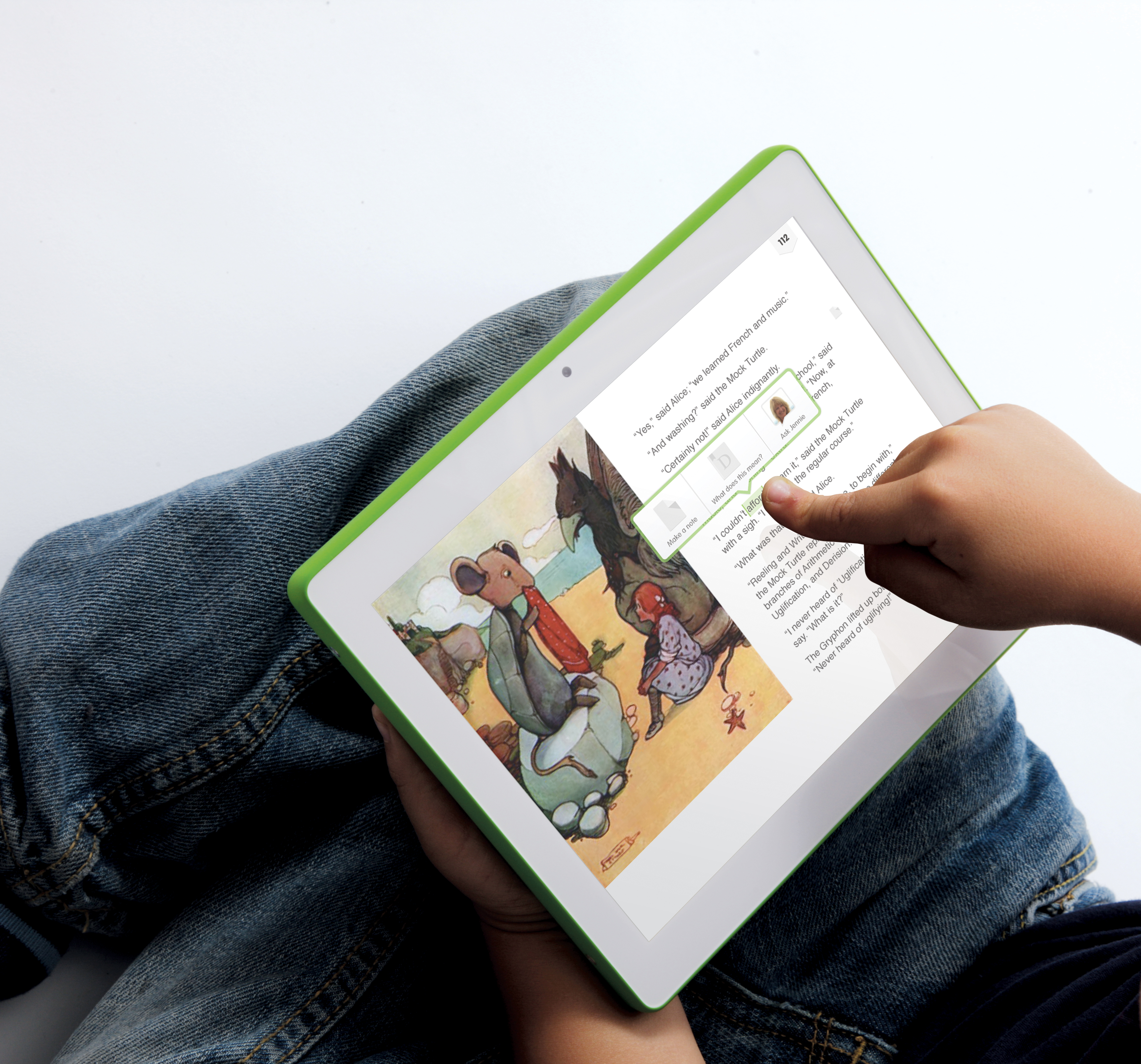
Touch screen

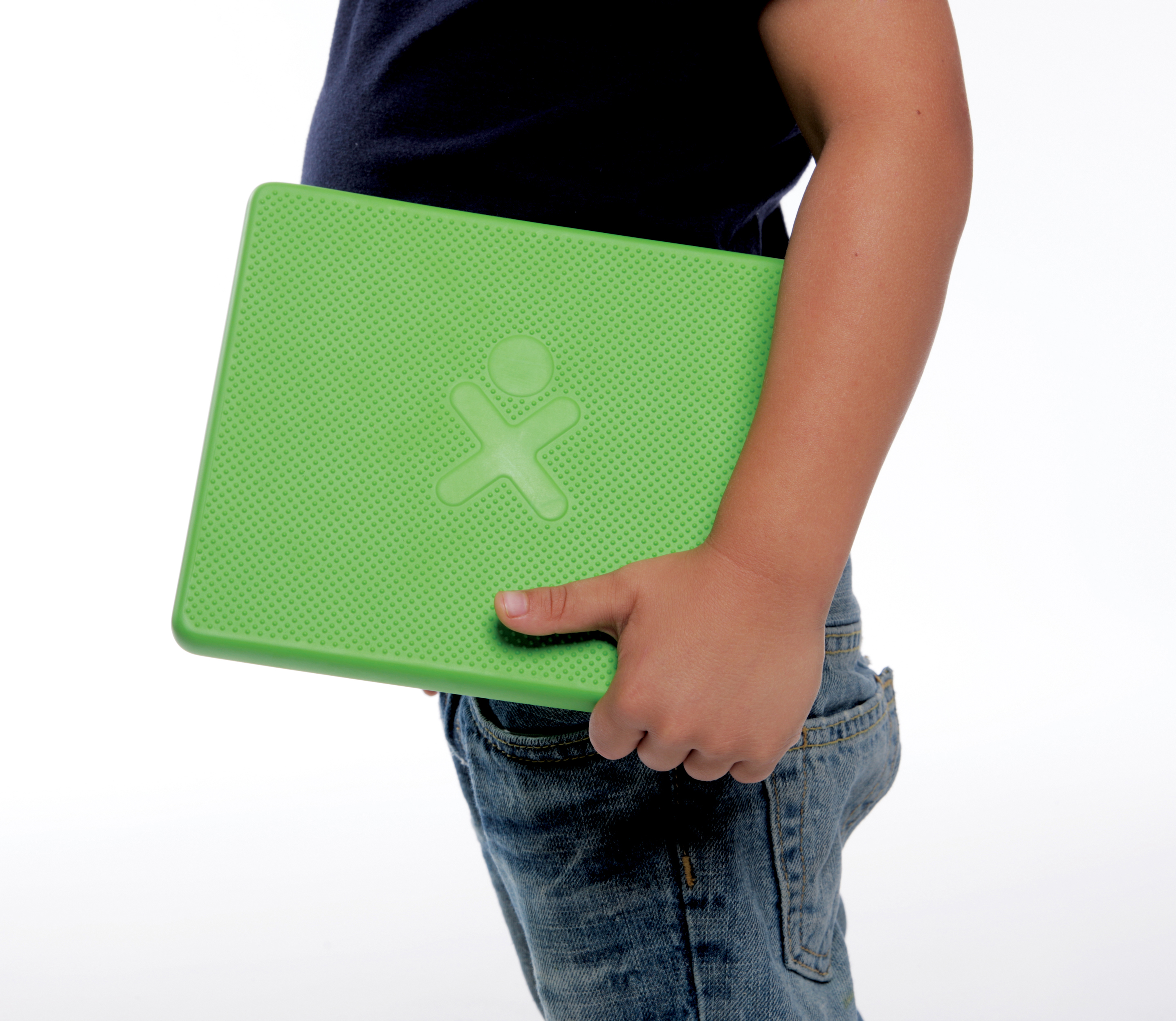
