= Charles Kane (business executive) =

Business executive

Charles Kane is a business executive and former president and chief operations officer of the One Laptop Per Child Association. Kane was promoted to president of OLPC on May 2, 2008. Previously, Kane was the chief financial officer of RSA Security, a security firm acquired by EMC. He also previously served as president and chief executive officer of Corechange, a software firm acquired by Open Text. Since 2006 he has been an adjunct professor at MIT Sloan Graduate School of Management. He is married to Dr. Amanda Kempa-Kane, who earned her doctorate in history at Oxford University and is a historian at the Kennedy School of Government, Harvard University, and has two children.

== See also ==
- One Laptop per Child
