= Navifon =

NaviFon
- Original author(s): NaviFon LLC
- Developer(s): NaviFon LLC
- Initial release: 2 February 2007; 18 years ago
- Operating system: Windows Mobile, Android, Java ME, Symbian, BlackBerry, iOS, Bada
- Available in: Chinese, Czech, English, French, German, Lithuanian, Polish, Russian
- Type: GPS navigation software
- Website: navifon.ru

NaviFon is a free mobile navigation application, designed specifically for mobile devices, and has all the functions of the portable device. Works on all mobile platforms: Windows Mobile, iPhone, Java, Symbian S60 ed.3 and S60 ed.5., Android, BlackBerry, and Bada. It allows using a phone as a full GPS navigator. Since 2007, NaviFon has been installed by Samsung on phones at the factory. It is available for download in all popular applications stores: iTunes Store, GetJar, and Android Market.

== Features ==
- Cross-platform
- Find the addresses and objects on the map
- Service information on the cameras and traffic jams
- Pedestrian and Vehicle Routes
- Find points of interest
- View information on nearby objects
- Universal personal account on the site
- Find the coordinates
- The route to the intersection
- Weather on the ground
- Report on the route
- 3D and night mode decoupling navigation
- Notification of a location by SMS

== Reviews ==
Practically NaviFon works on any modern mobile phone with support of JAVA platform. A Bluetooth GPS receiver pinpoints your current position (longitude and latitude) and transmits this information via Bluetooth to your mobile phone (GPS-Bluetooth device is not required for mobile devices that already have internal “build in” GPS module). By entering your destination (Street address, City, Category...) into the application.

== Instructional video ==
For added convenience, users of communication and a quick overview of the functions of the program, there are video instructions for use NaviFon. In these details the functions of the program, about how to contact the program on different phones. You can view a video on the channel NaviFon in Youtube
