= Aakash 2 =

Android-based tablet computer

- Developer: DataWind
- Manufacturer: VMC Systems, Hyderabad
- Type: Tablet computer
- Generation: Second
- Operating system: Android 4.0.3 Ice Cream Sandwich
- CPU: Allwinner A13 (ARM Cortex A8 @ 1 GHz processor)
- Memory: 512 MB RAM
- Storage: Flash memory Internal: 4 GB flash External: 2 to 32 GB microSD slot
- Display: 800 × 480 px 7 in (18 cm) diagonal
- Sound: Built in microphone; stereo earphones; 3.5 mm jack
- Input: Multi-touch Capacitive Touch screen
- Camera: Front VGA
- Touchpad: Capacitive
- Connectivity: Mini-USB; Wi-Fi (802.11 a/b/g/n)
- Power: 3000 mAh li-po battery
- Predecessor: Aakash
- Successor: Aakash 3
- Related: UbiSlate 7C
- Website: http://www.akashtablet.com/

The Aakash 2 (also sold as the Ubislate 7Ci) is an Android-based tablet computer produced by British company DataWind. In an announcement in March 2012, the Telecom Minister, Mr. Kapil Sibal, who was also in charge of Ministry of Human Resources and Development had announced that DoT (Department of Telecom) had cleared the proposal to distribute 50 lakh (5 million) units of tablet PCs to students. It is the follow-up to the Aakash tablet.

The Minister had also announced that C-DAC and IIT-Mumbai would together be responsible for the specification, quality, and testing of Aakash 2. An updated version was launched on November 11, 2012.

Retail(start) price of Datawind UbiSlate 7Ci as of the end of 2013, is about 30 GBP in UK(Europe), about 150 PLN.

== Subsidised by the Indian government ==
It was made available to students in India at roughly a quarter of its full price, in a scheme subsidized by the Indian government. Many school textbooks were made available accessible in PDF form from the respective education board websites.

Android applications are sold via the rupee-priced Google Play app store.

== Hardware ==
The hardware is fixed, and the product has been described as a stable and usable commercial product. The 7” screen is capacitive multi-touch (800x480), with pinch and zoom support. The tablet's boot-up time is 46 seconds. Battery life is up to 3 hours on the 3000 mAh battery.

== Ubislate 7C+ ==
Ubislate 7C+(EDGE) (also regarded as Aakash 3) was released in November 2012 with SIM functionality, providing GPRS and EDGE service, along with Wi-Fi. It runs on Android OS 4.0.3 Ice Cream Sandwich and has a front-facing VGA camera. It has a 512 MB RAM and ARM Cortex A8 processor, clocked at 1.5 GHz.

== Made in China controversies ==
Newspapers have accused DataWind of reselling a product which was designed and manufactured in China, purchased off-the-shelf and then sold in India. DataWind in its response to the accusation, said that they sourced the kits from China and assembled and programmed them in India at its facilities in Amritsar, Punjab, and Delhi, and then supplied the same to the Indian Government HRD. Chinese manufacturers have said that they sold "ready-to-use" tablets to Datawind.
