= Aakash (tablet) =

Indian Government promoted tablet computer

Aakash (Asec Internationals as1753)
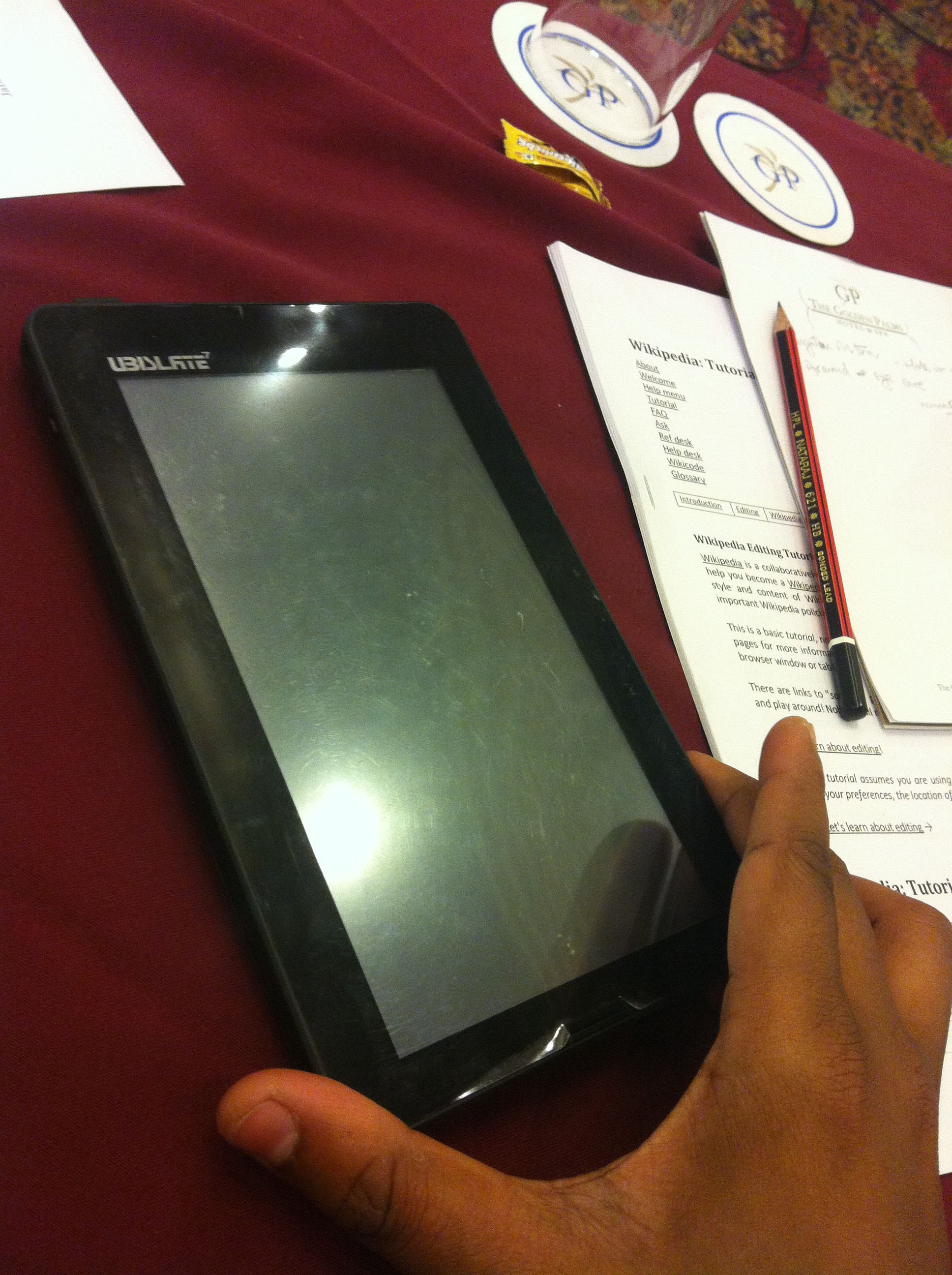
- Image of the Ubislate7 – initial version of Aakash.
- Manufacturer: VMC Systems, Hyderabad
- Type: Tablet computer
- Introductory price: US$35 / ₹ 2,250
- Media: GSM Device
- Operating system: Android 2.3 Gingerbread
- CPU: ARM 11 Cortex-A8 @ 800 MHz processor
- Memory: 256 MB RAM
- Storage: Flash memory Internal: 2 GB flash External: 2 to 32 GB microSD slot
- Display: 800 × 480 px 7 in (18 cm) diagonal
- Sound: Built in microphone; stereo earphones; 3.5 mm jack
- Input: Multi-touch touch screen
- Camera: None
- Touchpad: Resistive
- Connectivity: Wi-Fi (802.11 a/b/g/n)
- Power: 3000 mAh li-po battery
- Online services: GetJar Market
- Dimensions: 190.5 mm (7.50 in) H 118.5 mm (4.67 in) W 15.7 mm (0.62 in) D
- Weight: 350 g (12 oz)
- Predecessor: Sakshat
- Successor: Aakash 2
- Related: UbiSlate 7+
- Website: www.akashtablet.com

Aakash a.k.a. Ubislate 7+, is a low-cost Android-based tablet computer promoted by the Government of India as part of an initiative to link 25,000 colleges and 400 universities in an e-learning program. It was produced by the British-Canadian company DataWind, and manufactured by the company, at a production center in Hyderabad. The tablet was officially launched as the Aakash in New Delhi on 5 October 2011. The Indian Ministry of Human Resource Development announced an upgraded second-generation model called Aakash 2 in April 2012.

The Aakash had a 7-inch touch screen, ARM 11 processor, and 256 MB RAM and ran the Android 2.2 operating system. It had two USB ports and delivered high definition (HD) quality video. For applications; the Aakash had access to Getjar, an independent market, rather than the Android Market.

Originally projected as a "$35 laptop", the device was to be sold to the Government of India and distributed to university students – initially at US$50 until further orders are received and projected eventually to achieve the target $35 price. A commercial version of Aakash was marketed as UbiSlate 7+ at a price of $60. The Aakash 2, code named UbiSlate 7C, was released on 11 November 2012.

== Etymology ==
The device was initially called the Sakshat tablet, later changed to Aakash, which is derived from the Sanskrit word Akasha (Devanagari आकाश) with several related meanings such as empty space and outer space. The word in Hindi means "sky".

== History ==
The aspiration to create a "Made in India" computer was first reflected in a prototype "Simputer" that was produced in small numbers. Bangalore-based CPSU, Bharat Electronics Ltd manufactured around 5,000 Simputers for Indian customers from 2002 to 2007. In 2011, Kapil Sibal announced an anticipated low-cost computing device to compete with the One Laptop per Child (OLPC) initiative, though intended for urban college students rather than the OLPC's rural, underprivileged students.

A year later, the MHRD announced that the low-cost computer would be launched in six weeks. Nine weeks later, the MHRD showcased a tablet named "Aakash", not nearly what had been projected and at US$60 rather than the projected $35. "NDTV" reported that the new low-cost tablet was considerably less able than the previously shown prototype and was going to cost about twice as much.

While it was once projected as a laptop, the design has evolved into a tablet computer. At the inauguration of the National Mission on Education Program organized by the Union HRD Ministry in 2009, joint secretary N. K. Sinha had said that the computing device is 10 inches (which is around 25.5 cm) long and 5 inches (12.5 cm) wide and priced at around US$30.

India's Human Resource Development Minister, Kapil Sibal, unveiled a prototype on 22 July 2010, which was later given out to 500 college students to collect feedback. The price of the device exhibited was projected at US$35, eventually to drop to US$20 and ultimately to US$10. After the device was unveiled, OLPC chairman Nicholas Negroponte offered full access to OLPC technology at no cost to the Indian team.

The tablet was shown on the television program "Gadget Guru" aired on NDTV in August 2010, when it was shown to have 256 MB RAM and 2 GB of internal flash memory storage and demonstrated running the Android operating system featuring video playback, internal Wi-Fi and cellular data via an external 3G modem.

The device was developed as part of the country's aim to link 25,000 colleges and 400 universities in an e-learning program. Originally projected as a "$35 laptop", the device was planned to be sold to the Government of India and distributed to university students – initially at US$50. until further orders are received and projected eventually to achieve the target price of US$35.

A commercial version was eventually released online as the UbiSlate7 tablet PC at ₹3,000 (US$31) and the Ubislate7+ tablet PC at ₹3,500 (US$36) on 11 November 2012 with a plan to offer it with subsidized cost for students at ₹1,130 (US$12). As of February 2012, DataWind had over 1,400,000 booking orders, but had only shipped 10,000 units which were 0.7% of booking orders. As of November 2012, many customers who booked their orders still had not received their computers and were offered refunds.

== Specifications ==
As released on 5 October 2011, the Aakash features an overall size of 190.5 x 118.5 x 15.7 mm with a 180 millimetres (7.1 in) resistive touchscreen, a weight of 350 grams (12 oz), and using the Android 2.2 operating system with access to the proprietary marketplace Getjar (not the Android Market), developed by DataWind.

The processor runs at 366 MHz; there is a graphics accelerator and high definition(HD) video coprocessor. The tablet has 256 MB RAM, a microSD slot with a 2 GB microSD card (expandable up to 32 GB), two USB ports, a 3.5 mm audio output and input jack, a 2100 mAh battery, Wi-Fi capability, a browser developed by DataWind, and an internal cellular and Subscriber Identity Module (SIM) modem. Power consumption is 2 watts, and there is a solar charging option.

The Aakash is designed to support various documents (DOC, DOCX, PPT, PPTX, XLS, XLSX, ODT, ODP, and PDF), image (PNG, JPG, BMP, and GIF), audio (MP3, AAC, AC3, WAV, and WMA) and video (MPEG2, MPEG4, AVI, and FLV) file formats and includes an application for access to YouTube video content.

Comparison of Aakash tablets
Tablet name	Company	Price (INR)	CPU speed	Internal storage (RAM)	External storage (SD Card)	Battery	Operating system	Network	Phone Call	Screen	Android Store	Launch Date	Manufactured in
Sakshat	HCL	2,200	366 MHz	256 MB	2 GB	2100 mAh	Android 2.2 Froyo	Wi-Fi only	VoIP only	800x480 px Resistive screen	No	Canceled	India
Aakash / Ubislate 7	Datawind	2,500	ARM11, 366 MHz	256 MB	2 GB (expandable up to 32 GB)	2100 mAh	Android 2.2 Froyo	Wi-Fi only	VoIP only	Resistive	No	December 2011	China
UbiSlate 7+ (discontinued)	Datawind	3,000	ARM 11, 366 MHz	256 MB	4 GB (expandable up to 32 GB)	3000 mAh	Android 2.3 Gingerbread	Wi-Fi + GPRS phone network	Yes	Resistive	No	April 2012	China
Ubislate 7Ri (discontinued)	Datawind	-	ARM Cortex-A8, 1 GHz	512 MB	4 GB (expandable up to 32 GB)	3000 mAh	Android 4.0.3 Ice Cream Sandwich	Wi-Fi	VoIP only	Resistive	Yes	April 2012	China
Ubislate 7R+ (discontinued)	Datawind	-	ARM Cortex-A8, 1 GHz	512 MB	4GB (expandable up to 32 GB)	3000 mAh	Android 4.0.3 Ice Cream Sandwich	Wi-Fi + GPRS Phone Network	Yes	Resistive	Yes	April 2012	China
Aakash 2, UbiSlate 7Ci	Datawind	4500	ARM Cortex-A8, 1 GHz	512 MB	4 GB (expandable up to 32 GB)	3000 mAh, 3hrs battery time	Android 4.0 Ice Cream Sandwich	Wi-Fi only	VoIP only	7-inch, 800×480 px capacitive display	Yes	11 November 2012	
Aakash 3, UbiSlate 7C+(EDGE)	Datawind	4999	ARM Cortex-A8, 1 GHz	512 MB	4 GB (expandable up to 32 GB)	3000 mAh, 3hrs battery time	Android 4.0.3 Ice Cream Sandwich	Wi-Fi + GPRS	Yes	7-inch, 800×480 px capacitive display	Yes	11 November 2012	

=== Variants ===
All the tablets in the series are categorized as follows:

Letter/symbol	Meaning
7	7-inch touchscreen
+	Has Wi-Fi and supports SIM
R	Resistive touchscreen
i	Has Wi-Fi and no SIM support
C	Capacitive touchscreen
Z	Has dual camera (both front and back facing) and Bluetooth support

== Development and testing ==
Kapil Sibal has stated that a million devices would be made available to students in 2011. The devices will be manufactured at a cost of ₹ 1500 (€23) each, half of which will be paid by the government and half by the institutions that would use it. In January 2011, the company initially chose to build the Sakshat, HCL Infosystems, failed to provide evidence that they had at least ₹ 600 million ($12.2 million) in bank guaranteed funds, as required by the Indian government, which has allocated $6.5 million to the project. As a result, the government put the project out for bidding again.

In June 2011, the HRD announced that it received a few samples from the production process, which are under testing. Also it mentions that each state in India provided 3000 samples for testing on their functionality, utility, and durability in field conditions. The Government of India announced that 10,000 (Sakshat) tablets will be delivered to schools and colleges by late June and over the next four months 90,000 more would be made available at a price of ₹ 2500 device. The government will subsidize the cost by about 50%, so a student would have to pay less than ₹ 1,500 for the device. Indian Ministry of Education is releasing educational videos in conjunction with IGNOU and at sakshat.ac.in. This preparation of content is meant for students with access to the Internet, India's first law-abiding Online Video Library.

Hardware development

IIT-Rajasthan's specifications were 1.2 GHz CPU and 700 MB RAM. It wanted the tablet to work after steep falls and in monsoon season, making the cost over Rs 5000. So the responsibility of drafting specifications will be shifted to IIT Mumbai, IIT Madras, and IIT Kanpur while PSUs are being considered for procurement of the Aakash Tablet.

Aakash 2 could have the 1 GB RAM, Capacitive TouchScreen Panel and a front-facing camera of VGA Quality (0.3 MP), capable of capturing video, that was announced earlier by Kapil Sibal. This version of the tablet may be announced only after October 2012 because of low funds in procuring the raw material for assembling and also setting up of assembling plant at Noida and Coimbatore. The Govt. officials say that the tablet may not be realized due to the pressure from various institutes and meager support from the Indian Government in regard to the funds regarding the process of the tablet procurement and assembly of the same.

35% of hardware components were sourced from South Korea, 25% from China, 16% from the US, 16% from India, and 8% from other countries.

== Hardware ==
The Ubislate 7 Series Tablet has a seven-inch touchscreen with 800×480 pixel resolution and uses Cortex A8 800Mhz processor (256 MB RAM) while the others have Cortex A8 1 GHz processor with 512 MB RAM. The initial model had two full size USB ports while in the final models they were reduced to a single Micro USB port. The Ubislate 7+ had 2 GB flash memory while the final models have 4 GB flash memory. All of the models support MicroSD cards, up to 32 GB. The final models also features a G-Sensor for maintaining orientation. Like other Android devices, these have no physical buttons except a home screen button, power button and volume rocker. The final models also has a front facing VGA camera. The tablets use a proprietary power connector.

== Software ==
The Ubislate 7+ runs on Android 2.2 Froyo while an update to 2.3 Gingerbread is available. All other models run on Android 4.0.3 Ice Cream Sandwich. The tablets have a customized version of the operating system, which includes:

- Google Search in top left corner of home screen
- Workspace Effect Settings, next to Google search
- Volume Controls on the bottom
- Pre installed Apps include App Killer, UbiInfo, Ubimail, Internet Ubisurfer etc.

The Ubislate 7+ has access to Getjar app store while others have complete access to Google Playstore.

== Reception ==
Problems such as low memory, frequent system freezes, poor sound quality, absence of support for all formats, and inability to install free software available online were also cited by users. Technical commentator Prasanto Roy criticized issues such as a low battery life, an insufficient 7" screen, and absence of training and support infrastructure, especially in rural areas. UbiSlate 7+ will be released by 2012. The producer has finalized the improvements of Aakash.

After receiving feedback on the early release model from over 500 users from educational institutions, DataWind announced the next iteration that will have a new microprocessor of 700 MHz versus the original 366 MHz processor. This will improve the speed of the tablet and solve the existing problems of quick overheating, frequent system freeze, poor sound quality, absence of support for all formats, and the inability to install free online software. The amount of memory, storage, and USB ports will remain the same.

On 16 December 2011, DataWind opened Aakash booking online in their official website at ₹ 2500 with one week delivery time and cash on delivery facility, and its upgraded version Ubislate 7+ was available for booking at ₹ 2999. On 19 December 2011, DataWind reported that the first phase of Aakash tablet had been sold out completely, just three days since it was opened for Online booking. UbiSlate 7+ production capacity of January, February, and March have already been sold. Now, April production is open for booking. By 3 January 2012, 1.4 million orders had been received since the UbiSlate 7+ was put up for sale online. By the end of January 2012, booking orders for UbiSlate 7+ have crossed two million. By 13 April 2012, Datawind severed connection with its supplier Quad, further delaying the assembly of UbiSlate 7+. While Quad claims DataWind has not paid it, the Canadian company alleges that its former partner infringed its intellectual property rights by trying to sell directly to the Indian Institute of Technology (IIT) Rajasthan.

In the November 2012 issue of PCQuest, some letters described Datawind to be a fraud company, and the users wanted to sue the company in consumer court.

== Plans ==
On 26 April 2012, Datawind launched UbiSlate 7+ and Ubislate 7C tablet in physical stores at Delhi. Reliance Industries Limited (RIL) has announced the plan to launch LTE(4G) Tablet between ₹ 3500–5000, with low-cost Internet service. This tablet will be an upgraded version of Aakash developed by DataWind. Indian Govt. HRD has revealed that Aakash 2 will be announced in May 2012. Hindustan Computers Limited (HCL), Bharat Heavy Electricals Limited (BHEL), DataWind, Wishtel, and Telmoco Development Labs are Interested in bidding at the Aakash 2 contract auction.

The low-cost Akash tablet is under trials in IIT Bombay and is being tested against the new specifications.

The Indian government also hopes to produce Aakash for the export market. On a visit to Turkmenistan in September 2012, the Indian Telecom Minister Kapil Sibal, suggested forming a joint venture company which may manufacture Aakash. In this joint venture, the Indian side would design the necessary hardware and software of the tablet, fulfilling the Turkmen side needs. Besides supplying the low-cost tablets, the joint venture company could market the product to other international markets.

According to allegations made in the Hindustan Times, the Tuli brothers "may have" procured these devices off-the-shelf from manufacturers in China and sold them to the Indian government at the purchase price.Suneet Singh Tuli, CEO of DataWind, however, insisted that only the manufacture of the motherboards were subcontracted to Chinese manufacturers, following which the components were placed in DIY kits which DataWind assembled and sold to the Indian government HRD. Chinese manufacturers allege that they sold "ready-to-use" tablets to Datawind, and that they manufactured the touch screens as well. Tuli, however, insists that the touch screens were manufactured by DataWind in Canada.

== See also ==
- DataWind
- Aakash (Tablet Series)
- BSNL Pantel Tablet
- Nexus 7 Tablet
- Aakash 2 (Ubislate 7Ci)
- Simputer
