= The Digital Delusion =

2025 book by Jared Cooney Horvath

The Digital Delusion: How Classroom Technology Harms Our Kids' Learning—and How to Help Them Thrive Again is a work of non-fiction by American neuroscientist Jared Cooney Horvath. Self published in 2025, the book examines the apparent paradox where education technology (EdTech) has been projected to transform the learning experience of school students, and yet there is evidence that this promise remains unmet, or at least unproven. The industry has grown to a size equivalent to $400 billion, while Horvath argues that children's cognitive abilities have declined since the year 2000.

The book has prompted many parents and school officials to reconsider their approaches to the use of computers and tablets in classrooms. In Granville County, North Carolina, the book inspired school officials to conduct an experiment in which students were not allowed to use laptops on "tech-free" Tuesdays and Thursdays. Teachers said the experiment showed that students became more engaged in learning without the electronic devices. One teacher reported that "completing tasks on paper required them to slow down and think through each step, which led to stronger understanding rather than rushing to an answer.”

In the spring of 2026, the self-published book was acquired by Harmony, an imprint of Penguin Random House, for release in August 2026.

== Critical reception ==
Carl Hendrick, writing for Education Next, called it "an impressive piece of work" and praised how its "systematic marshalling of evidence" was its strength, noting that although the evidence Horvath presented "risks overclaiming", the book "deserves serious attention from anyone concerned with education outcomes". The Cyprus Mail was equally positive, stating that the book "makes a compelling case that EdTech has successfully transformed our children's education, but that the transformation has been unequivocally negative".

Matt Barnum, writing for Chalkbeat, was more critical, stating that although "there's no smoking-gun data showing that ed-tech is at the root of, or even contributing to, recent learning declines", while noting that The Digital Delusion "should still give schools and educators some pause". Barnum noted that Horvath's book "has a number of significant holes", criticizing what he saw as an overreliance on correlative data and the summary of research utilized throughout. However, Barnum noted that "Horvath is perhaps on the strongest ground in his summary of cognitive science research". Peter Bergman, an associate professor of economics at the University of Texas at Austin stated that "it's very hard to interpret correlations" and that "it's rare to have one neat story that just explains some big macro trend across the country".

In a review for Education Review, University of British Columbia lecturer Manouchehe Madani Civi described The Digital Delusion as "provocative" and "particularly persuasive." While noting that international comparisons cannot account for all classroom-level social and cultural differences, Civi calls the book an "exceptionally strong critique" and "a cornerstone of contemporary educational debate."

In the wake of the book's publication, Horvath has given testimony to the United States Senate and state legislatures, as part of a debate about the appropriate guardrails on screen time in schools, and the role of EdTech.
