= Educational technology in sub-Saharan Africa =

Educational aspect of parts of Africa

Educational technology in sub-Saharan Africa refers to the promotion, development and use of information and communication technologies (ICT), m-learning, media, and other technological tools to improve aspects of education in sub-Saharan Africa. Since the 1960s, various information and communication technologies have aroused strong interest in sub-Saharan Africa as a way of increasing access to education, and enhancing its quality and fairness.

== History: Radio and television ==
The first initiatives to introduce technologies into education were carried out by States directly, as they were at the time embarking on wide-ranging education reforms. During that period – from decolonization through to the 1980s – the dominant paradigm in education, common to African States and international organizations, was that of the interventionist State. Against that background, major large- scale programmes were developed, which were to some extent successful. In this way, the Bouaké schools radio in Côte d'Ivoire allowed more than 2,000 teachers per year to be trained in the 1970s.

Radio was one of the first technologies to be put to work in the service of education in sub-Saharan Africa. In 1986, in Guinea, an experimental schools radio project was started at the national educational research and documentation institute (l'Institut national de documentation, de recherche et d'action pédagogique, the present-day Indrap), with the assistance of the cultural and technical cooperation agency that is now the Organisation internationale de la Francophonie (OIF). The radio broadcasts were therefore mainly focused on primary teachers' needs so as to improve their teaching techniques, and on subjects that were considered as priorities for the pupils: French, arithmetic and science. In the early 1990s, radio was given a broader role in the promotion of basic education, with the support of UNICEF, especially with respect to girls' access to education. While the results in terms of scholastic performance are still not properly understood, these programmes helped to train a large number of teachers.

Throughout the 1960s, the concept of educational television took hold in Africa. One of the most iconic examples of the development of these programmes can be found in Côte d'Ivoire. After initial trials in Senegal and Niger (where educational television existed before national television) in 1965 and 1966, Côte d'Ivoire was chosen in 1971 as the testing ground, then for the large-scale roll-out, of a massive project for schooling via television. The Programme for Education by Television (PETV) was made the responsibility of UNESCO, assisted by cooperation from Belgium, France and the Ford Foundation. The PETV gave an illustration of how, from the 1970s, innovative programmes could be launched with the aid of the "new" ICT.

In the first five years, the rate of school enrolment in that country went from 20% to over 60%. While 300,000 pupils were receiving the programmes in 1975–1976, this had increased to 700,000 by 1980 (out of a total of one million pupils). Some evaluation reports indicate that the proportion of pupils who had had the benefit of television courses entering the sixth year of study was significantly higher than for the others, that the percentage having to retake a year had fallen from 30% to 10% during the lifetime of the project, and that pupils had acquired a better mastery of spoken French. The programme ran for 14 years and finally ended in 1982.

== Introduction of computer technology ==
Between 1990 and 2000, multiple actions were started to turn technologies into a lever for improving education in sub-Saharan Africa. Many initiatives focused on equipping schools with computer hardware. A number of NGOs contributed, on varying scales, to bringing computer hardware into Africa, such as groups like Computer Aid International, Digital Links, SchoolNet Africa and World Computer Exchange. Sometimes with backing from cooperation agencies or development agencies like USAID, the African Bank Limited or the French Ministry of Foreign Affairs, these individual initiatives grew without adequate coordination.

=== Africa Information Society Initiative (AISI) ===
A large part of the backbone of ICT4D was the action framework called the Africa Information Society Initiative (AISI). Seeking to install the ICT infrastructure in Africa, its goals were to were connect every single African village with the global information network by 2010 and spur growth of smaller ICT initiatives in different sectors. A decade after its enactment, there are still hundreds of villages without electricity and connectivity between disparate ICTs is lacking.

=== One Laptop per Child (OLPC) ===
In the 2000s, various projects were begun, mainly aimed at giving each school child access to IT tools, individually or shared among a small group. Personalizing the practice of computer technology multiplies the potential uses of ICT in education, not just by familiarization with the technology tools themselves (learning technology), but also by the acquisition of cognitive skills (learning through technology). The American One Laptop per Child (OLPC) project, launched in several African countries in 2005, aimed to equip schools with laptop computers at low cost. While the average price of an inexpensive personal computer was between US$200 and US$500, OLPC offered its ultraportable XO-1 computer at the price of US$100. This technological breakthrough marked an important step in potential access to ICT. OLPC became an institutional system: the programme was "bought" by governments, which then took responsibility for distribution to the schools. The underlying logic of the initiative was one of centralization, thus enabling the large-scale distribution of the equipment. Almost 2 million teachers and pupils are now involved in the programme worldwide and more than 2.4 million computers have been delivered. Sugar is the free teaching platform installed on the XO computers from the OLPC Foundation. Sugar is both a graphic interface at the same time as containing applications, and was designed specifically for children, to support them in their learning with a variety of available content: reading courses, drawing tools, e-books, interactive applications and so on.

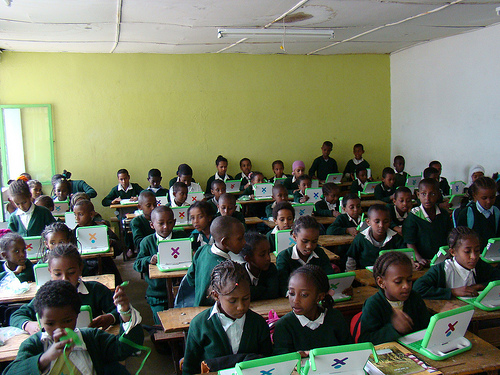
A school in Ethiopia that received laptops from the OLPC program

=== Criticisms of One Laptop per Child in Sub-Saharan Africa ===
Unlike more large scale efforts to integrate and enhance education, the One Laptop per Child (OLPC) program faces criticism on the premise that targeting the poorest areas in Africa that may not have the financial viability to afford laptop computers and maintenance costs for the children. Despite its objectives of distributing 100 to 150 million laptops by the year 2008 to the developing countries with the most need, it is measured that as of August 2010, more than 80 percent of the 1.5 million laptops have been sent to high or upper middle income countries according to the World Bank's classifications.

==== Implementation Challenges ====
There have been a lot of challenges with regards to the implementation of this initiative. Here are a few of those challenges:

===== Infrastructure Issues =====
One of the primary criticisms of OLPC in Sub-Saharan Africa has been the lack of infrastructure to support the program. Many schools in the region lack reliable electricity, internet connectivity, and safe storage facilities for the laptops, which hinder the effective use of the devices.

===== Maintenance and Technical Support =====
The durability and self-repair design of the XO laptops were meant to address the harsh conditions in developing regions. However, ongoing technical support and maintenance were often lacking, as local technicians frequently did not have the necessary training or resources to repair the laptops, resulting in many devices becoming unusable over time.

=== Alternatives to One Laptop Per Child ===
In comparing the distribution of money of the One Laptop per Child (OLPC) program with other channels of education betterment, there are many low-cost programs that have more definitive impact than OPLC's distribution laptops to "low-income" countries. Some other proposed cost-benefit ratios for other aid programs seeking to improve educational and socioeconomic conditions include:

- Spending $8 per individual per year over a span of 5 years could potentially save 11 million lives.
- Spending $0.50 per student (this was implemented in Kenya), which was successful in increasing school participation by 14 percent.
- Building schools.
- Hiring additional instructors.
- Focusing on minimizing and mitigating costs of attention school and getting textbooks.

Many of these low-cost programs have sought to specifically increase the access to education for women in hopes of increase literacy, equality in pay, economic viability, better productivity, more democratic and responsive political institutions, and better overall public health.

=== Classmate PC ===
Following on from OLPC, the Intel group launched Classmate PC, a similar programme also intended for pupils in developing countries. Though it has a smaller presence in sub-Saharan Africa than the OLPC project, Classmate PC has enabled laptop computers to be delivered to primary schools in the Seychelles and Kenya, particularly in rural areas.

=== Computer for School in Kenya (CFSK) ===
The CFSK (Computer for School in Kenya) project was started in 2002 with the aim of distributing computers to almost 9,000 schools.

== Open Educational Resources (OER) ==
According to UNESCO in 2002, open educational resources (OERs) are open provisions of educational resources that are enabled by ICTs for use and adaptation by users for non-commercial users. In the context of teacher education in Sub-Saharan Africa, the most notable OER project is TESSA, Teacher Education in Sub-Saharan Africa, which constitutes 13 African institutions and five international organizations working to equip teachers with practical activities for classrooms and language specific modules.

There are three different modes of use for OERs across the 200,000 teachers in Ghana, Kenya, Nigeria, South Africa, Rwanda, Sudan, Uganda, Tanzania, and Zambia: very structured modules, loosely structured modules, and guided modules.

Specifically in Nigeria and Sudan, large-scale distance education is primarily used for teacher education and thus highly structured guides with TESSA study units are given to trainee teachers, who are often in rural areas with limited Internet access.

Some criticisms of TESSA OERs cited by teachers include lack of relevance of curriculum materials and existing satisfaction with current resources.

== Sustainable ICT for development in Sub-Saharan Africa ==
One of the most prominent paradigms for technological change and innovation in Sub-Saharan African has been the information and communication technologies for development (ICT4D) initiative. Positioned as an avenue to move millions of individuals out of poverty in developing regions, few reports on experiments of such practices have demonstrated success of ICT4D on the standard of living in Africa. Regardless, ICT4D is still rendered as one of the most prominent technological interventions in the region. Every year, proposals for more sustainable ICT4D initiatives are suggested by researchers from around the world at the AFRICOMM Conference.

=== Motivations for Sustainable ICT ===
==== Landscape ====
With the advent of new technologies and communication as a means for organization and development between public and private sectors in developing countries, in addition to the growing penetration of mobile devices due to their increasing affordability, the poor in Sub-Saharan African have largely been seen as both producers and consumers of information and communication technologies.

According to a 2013 study conducted by the GSM Association, the number of mobile subscribers in Sub-Saharan Africa has increased 18 percent per year between the years 2007 and 2012. In 2012, the number of mobile subscriptions in Sub-Saharan African reached almost 650 million, greater than both that in the US and EU.

Android penetration is the highest due to easy integration of social innovation tools in areas of e-health, e-learning, waste management, mobile banking, etc., and phones are the preferred way for many to access the internet.

Initially, ICT in Sub-Saharan Africa was primarily restricted to private use, but today it has been introduced in formal and institutional spheres as a tool for development, social growth, economic expansion and population growth. A study conducted by the McKinsey Global Institute (MGC) released in November 2015 highlights that the internet only contributes 2.9 percent to Kenya's GDP and 1.2 percent to South Africa's GDP.

==== Mobile ICT ====
There is a huge push for mobile ICT in Sub-Saharan Africa for three key reasons:

1. Nations in this region are expanding their telecommunications sectors.
2. Consumers are unsatisfied with the inadequate fixed-line ICT.
3. Wireless technology has rapidly diffused, and this is the base for mediating business transactions. This lends to the growth of a sustainable m-commerce sector.

==== Motivations for Growth ====
Beyond trying to increase GDP growth in the short-term, ICT is covered in four of the 17 different Sustainable Development Goals (SDGs), which were selected by the UN in September 2015. Seen and described as a catalyst for education, infrastructure development, sustainable industrialization and gender equality, the motivations for ICT's spread are outlined below:

1. Catalyst for development - Initially more pertinent to leisure use cases, ICT intersects with a wide array of basic need issues in areas of education, transportation, health, energy use, nutrition, water accessibility, etc. There have been many successful catalyst companies as a result, and some notable ones include:
  1. Obami – a social and educational learning platform that started in South Africa and has been adopted by more than 30,000 educators in schools across Sub-Saharan Africa.
  2. Gifted Mom - a mobile health platform that started in Cameroon and betters the health conditions of women who are pregnant and newborn children in rural communities.
  3. M-Pesa - a mobile payment system that originally launched in Kenya and now has more than 30 million users who use it for loans, health provisions, purchases and international transfers.
    1. Significance: This example is particularly important to educational technology, because it was largely dependent on policy decisions from the Kenyan government to encourage competition in the sector of telecommunications and ICT-driven innovation, which broke the monopoly of state-led telecommunications and fostered competition among firms. The case of M-Pesa also highlights the importance of communal trust that enables the successful integration of ICTs into various socio-economic activities on an institutional level. Without the incorporation and on-boarding of ICT objectives on the national development agenda, coupled with agreement of local stakeholders, M-Pesa would not have been as successful as it has been. Applied to the case of educational technology, unilaterally funded ICTs may be largely unsuccessful to enact institutional change without the willingness of the local and national governments.
  4. Jumia - an online shopping marketplace that began in Nigeria and has spread to 23 different African countries.
  5. W Afate - a $100 3-D printer that is constructed from discarded electronic waste.
  6. M-Louma - a web and mobile platform that connects farmers with food buyers using real-time market price estimates, localizations and information for improving the agriculture supply chain.
2. Inclusive growth - Proponents of ICT suggest that its worthiness extends beyond a luxury for Africa and seeks to efficiently contribute to sustainable and inclusive growth for many different countries in Sub-Saharan Africa.
3. Opportunity for sustainability - Currently, little has been done in the management of electrical and electronic waste (EEW). Without necessary regulations for dealing with recycling waste, there is a large market for tools in sustainability.
4. Improving education - In a study on ICT adoption and the digital divide, it was found that the usage of computers and Internet access is directly linked to education. If the growth of the Internet aligns with mobile emergence in the early 2000s, then it is projected that ICT can add approximately $300 billion to Africa's GDP by the year 2025. Dr. Hamadoun I. Toure, the secretary general of ITU, explains the extent of educational tech possibilities in his remarks:

"ICTs are truly transformational. With the power of technology, we can educate every African citizen, right across the continent. With the power of technology, we can open new opportunities and create new well-paid jobs for our people. With the power of technology we can deliver healthcare services to every African citizen, even in the remotest villages. And with the power of technology we can empower African women and leverage the fantastic energy and passion of young Africans. This is not just a pipe-dream: this is real."

==== Criticisms ====
1. Vague agenda - From 2005, the UN ICT Task Force has attempted to implement a clear agenda about ICT priorities and implementation strategy, yet this has not been created. Only broad, global goals have been set, and the major players in these have largely been the government bodies administration and non-governmental organizations that have been funded by the respective UN agency.
2. Knowledge gap – In order for ICT to truly provide inclusive growth, there needs to be educational structures and resources made available to understand how to use ICT. Currently, most of the learning is very informal (through friends or family) because administrations have typically refrained from investing in the digital sphere among other initiatives.
3. Minimal return on experiences - Questions about the success of ICT initiatives remain as there is a lack of documentation on failed and successful experiences.

=== Avenues for ICT Research in Education in Sub-Saharan Africa ===
The success or failure of ICTs in Sub-Saharan Africa is highly dependent on and challenged by regional problems such as food and water shortage, pandemic diseases, wars, or heritage loss. Some areas that have been identified for more immediate ICT4D action include health management, food and water, peace, and heritage. In terms of research initiatives that pertain to educational technology, one important use case is e-Learning, where the issue of penetration results from its targets. For example, in rural areas, e-Learning serves the purpose of advertisement and even propaganda, while in urban areas the purpose is more oriented to overcoming the shortage of teaching personnel.

== Barriers to ICT Use by Teachers in SSA ==
There are many physical and cultural factors that inhibit the complete adoption and integration of ICT practices by teachers in Sub-Saharan including and not limited to: unreliable access to electricity, limited software and hardware provisions, language limitation, country size and terrain, and population dispersion. Educational limiting factors include teachers' literacy rates, access to professional development, and missing unified national policy on computer use in schools.

== Distance learning in higher education ==
The main initiatives based on the use of ICT and the Internet in education originally focused on distance learning at university level. Thus, the African Virtual University (AVU), set up by the World Bank in 1997, was originally conceived as an alternative to traditional teaching. When it became an intergovernmental agency in 2003, it was training 40,000 people, mostly on short programmes. It shifted its focus to teacher training and to integrating technology into higher education. The AVU currently has ten e-learning centres.

The Agence universitaire de la Francophonie (AUF) has also, since 1999, set up around forty French-speaking digital campuses, more than half of them in Africa. In these infrastructures, dedicated to technology and set up within the universities, the AUF offers access to over 80 first and master's degrees entirely by distance learning, about 30 of which are awarded by African institutions and created with its support.

More recently, the MOOCs (Massive Open On- line Courses) phenomenon has grown up, first in the United States and then in Europe. The AUF is funding the development of the first MOOCs in higher education in Africa, in partnership with the French Ministry for Higher Education and with the support of UNESCO, and will use this form of remote learning to offer training and certification in ICTE skills for teachers. The African universities are taking a growing interest in this new method of learning, especially in view of the ever-increasing demand for higher education at a time when the continent is experiencing a deficit in qualified teachers.

== M-learning ==
M-learning (or m-education), or the use of mobile technology in the service of education, is a recent practice, opening up fresh possibilities in the educational field. Given the shortage of books in many African schools, the digital tablet was soon seen as a solution to make up for the missing textbooks, and taken up both by governments and international organizations. In practice, this shortage is one that affects almost every African country. In Cameroon there is on average one textbook on reading per 11 pupils and one mathematics book per 13 children. The price of digital content on tablets is falling sharply compared to the traditional media (books, CD and DVD, etc.). One digital textbook, for instance, costs one-third to half the price of a paper textbook, with zero marginal cost.

The digital tablet today has potential uses that extend beyond the classroom. The American NGO WorldReader has set itself the goal of extending access to reading to the most underprivileged children by distributing readers designed by Amazon. With the financial support of USAID, Kindles have been made available to 600,000 children in nine States in sub-Saharan Africa. The NGO has stated that children using this system spend 50% more time on reading, and read up to 90 books per year. Moreover, the report published by USAID following the iRead impact study in Ghana of 337 pupils in six different schools in 2010–2011 shows a number of positive aspects of the use of readers. The pupils using Kindles proved to be more enthusiastic about reading, which allowed them to improve their technical skills and achieve better scores in the standardized tests.

Old and outdated traditional computer hardware and the costs of maintenance have prompted those devising projects to turn to technologies that are cheaper to buy and easier to handle. Internet access is made easier by tablets and by the possibility of connecting via the mobile networks. Relatively cheap compared to the laptop computer and more flexible in its uses, tablets have the potential to provide an efficient response to part of the educational needs of sub-Saharan Africa.

== See also ==
- Education in Africa
- Educational technology
- E-Learning
- Open educational resources (OERs)
- Jumia

== Sources ==
This article incorporates text from a free content work. Licensed under CC-BY-SA IGO 3.0 (license statement/permission). Text taken from Digital Services for Education in Africa, 56–71, UNESCO, UNESCO. UNESCO.
