= Jeotex =

Canadian electronics manufacturer

Jeotex, Inc.
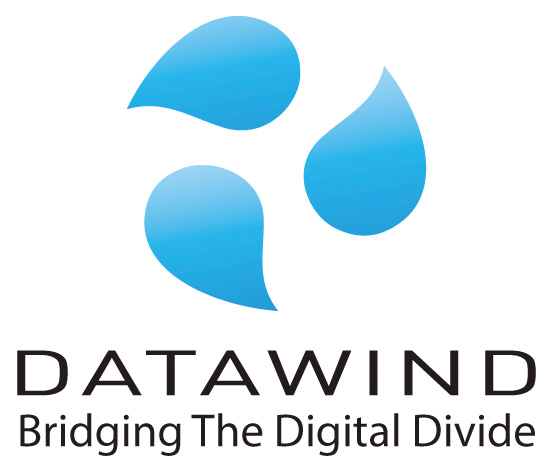
- Type: Public
- Industry: Computer hardware
- Founded: 2001; 25 years ago (Montreal, Quebec, Canada)
- Defunct: Declared bankruptcy June 10, 2021
- Headquarters: Mississauga, Ontario, Canada
- Key people: Suneet Tuli, CEO; Raja Tuli, Co-founder, CTO
- Products: Aakash tablet Ubislate; PocketSurfer; UbiSurfer
- Website: www.datawind.com

Jeotex Inc. (formerly known as Datawind Inc.) was a British-Canadian-Indian company that developed and manufactured low-cost tablet computers and smartphones. It was founded in 2001, Montreal, Quebec. The company aimed to produce tablets primarily for markets in India, Nigeria, the United Kingdom, Canada, and the United States. Jeotex has created the Aakash tablet computer, which was marketed as the "world's cheapest tablet" as it was priced at US$37.99 per unit in 2012. The Aakash was developed for India's Ministry for Human Resource Development (MHRD).

Jeotex also manufactured mobile internet devices, including PocketSurfer smartphones and Ubi-Surfer netbooks. Datawind was listed on the Toronto Stock Exchange from 2014 to October 2018 when it was relisted to the TSX Venture Exchange after failing to meet the listing requirements. It was delisted from the TSX Venture Exchange in 2021.

Datawind maintained offices in Montreal, Mississauga, London, Delhi and Amritsar. At a shareholder meeting in April 2019, it was agreed to change the name of the company to Jeotex Inc., and the change took effect later that month. However, on 10 June 2021, the company was declared bankrupt.

== History ==
Datawind was founded in Montreal in 2001 by brothers Suneet and Raja Tuli. Raja Tuli grew up in Northern Alberta, Canada. Suneet Tuli is a civil engineer who graduated from the University of Toronto, while Raja Tuli is a computer engineer, who graduated from the University of Alberta. Suneet Tuli was Datawind's chief executive officer and was responsible for its vision, strategy, and execution. Raja Tuli was the company's co-chairman and chief technology officer; he is an inventor with dozens of patents across a broad range of technologies related to the internet, imaging, and energy sustenance.

Datawind's product range included PocketSurfer smartphones and UbiSlate tablets. The company held a portfolio of 14 international patents for its web-delivery platform, which served as the foundation for its products. The company manufactured, marketed, and sold UbiSlate tablets to various countries, and also provided a year of free internet browsing in some countries. In collaboration with the government of India, the company developed the Aakash tablet, which gained worldwide attention for being "the world's cheapest tablet".

With its research and development based in Montreal, the company launched its first products in 2004, and their products were sold primarily in the United Kingdom. In 2004, the company was described as a "small tech shop" while marketing its key product, the PocketSurfer, a PDA/mobile phone/web browsing device. Several iterations of the PocketSurfer followed.

In 2009, the Indian government pledged a low-cost laptop to improve the quality of education within the country; however, the development process was beset by delays until Datawind won the tender for the tablet in late 2011. In the same year, Datawind made its entry into the Indian market with the launch of the Aakash tablet, specifically developed for the Indian government's goal of enhancing the quality of education. To encourage the growth of nationwide internet use, the Indian government announced at the October 2011 launch of the Aakash tablet that it will be offered to students at a subsidized price of $35 and to the public (as the Ubislate 7) for $60. Some analysts speculated the tablet will have a positive impact on the education sector and “has the potential to positively impact billions”. In his study, Rajat Kathuria, external consultant at the Indian Council for Research on International Economic Relations (ICRIER), stated the Indian economy could grow 10.08% faster with every 10% increase in internet and broadband connections in the country.

The Ubislate tablets were commercially launched in April 2012, by which time bookings for the device had exceeded three-million units - more than ten times the size of the total market for tablets in India in the previous year. Following the commercial launch of the UbiSlate tablets, the company was among the top three suppliers of tablets in India, according to Cybermedia Research. In the first quarter of 2013, Datawind dominated the Indian tablet market with the largest market share of tablets sold in India, excluding the Aakash devices that were to be supplied to the government. The company had plans to expand into tablet markets in the UK, the US, and Canada. Datawind also considered working with governments, NGOs, and distributors in Latin American and African countries, where its products were being deployed.

In 2012, Forbes magazine named the CEO of Datawind, Suneet Tuli, among the Impact 15 list of "classroom revolutionaries", who use innovative technologies to reinvent education for students and teachers throughout the world.

On 26 April 2012, Datawind launched the Ubislate 7+ and 7C tablets in India, by which time three million units had been booked.

In 2013, according to Cyber Media Research, India's quarterly market report, during the first quarter of 2013, as published in The Times of India, Datawind had a market share of 15.3%; the company pulled ahead of rivals Micromax and Apple, although this strong market did not include the Aakash series of tablets.

In July 2014, the company completed its initial public offering of 6,316,000 common shares at $4.75 CAD per share, totaling $30 million CAD. Datawind's shares traded on the Toronto Stock Exchange under the symbol, "DW". In November 2016, Datawind launched its state-of-the-art manufacturing facility in Hyderabad.

By October 2018, the company was delisted from the Toronto Stock Exchange, after its share price had fallen to $0.02 per share.

== Technology ==
Datawind's low-cost devices allow access to the internet at lower data costs and faster speeds across congested mobile wireless networks by using the company's patented data compression technology, which serves Web pages as compressed images. In a 2011 interview, the company stated that it would lower the price of the tablet by developing patents to shift the device's processing burden to "backend servers in the cloud," DataWind identified the need for low-cost devices for web access as a means to provide an alternative to increasing costs of mobile internet devices caused by the corresponding increases in web complexity, which require greater memory and processing power. Datawind's web-delivery platform reduces bandwidth consumption by creating a parallel processing environment, which shifts the burden of memory and processing power to back-end servers, thus allowing users to access the web with a lower-cost device and lower data costs.

Datawind's web-delivery platform serves as the basis for its product innovations. Based on a patent portfolio of 14 US and international patents, DataWind's technology accelerates the delivery of web-content across wireless networks, and reduces data consumption by a factor of ten.

Datawind's acceleration and data-reduction is accomplished through the use of proprietary algorithms on its application servers, which constitute a gateway between the primary (internet-based) content server, selected by the user, and the end user.

Datawind claims that its patented, acceleration technology allows its devices to deliver the fastest, mobile-web experience across cellular networks. A product review by PC Magazine of the PocketSurfer stated that "it's the only device that allows users to browse the web on a GPRS connection with any alacrity." In 2005, CNET stated that it was impressed with PocketSurfer's page-load times. Various media outlets conducted live, speed tests on television with competitive products, including some on 3G networks, which resulted in DataWind's PocketSurfer beating its competition in terms of page download time.

== Business model ==
Datawind's business model focuses on providing to entry-level users a cost-effective, web-access device with free Internet access. The company, as a mobile, virtual-network operator (MVNO), purchases wholesale access to mobile data from wireless-network operators or as part of a bundling relationship in order to offer free, mobile-internet access to its customers. Datawind's web-delivery platform reduces bandwidth consumption.

In November 2012, in an interview with the New York Times, Datawind's CEO explained that the company's business model was focused on pursuing price-sensitive, entry-level consumers, on forgoing hardware margins, and on driving a recurring revenue stream (i.e. after sales revenue from network operators, content, subscriptions, device warranties, page impressions, location-based content and advertising). Datawind's advertising revenues are generated by loading applications on its devices. The company has formulated a full-service ecosystem of revenue streams that drive down the cost of hardware; hence, the devices act as customer- acquisition tools that provide "free mobile-internet services". Datawind has partnered with numerous firms as part of a comprehensive supplier-and-partner strategy to build applications and generate content for its devices.

== Content, applications and advertising-based partnerships ==
Datawind has partnerships with multiple firms to develop installed, free content for its devices. The content includes educational, language-based, interactive smart books, multimedia, games, and productivity tools.

On 20 November 2013, according to an article published in The Financial Express, "Datawind, driving its mission to see smart devices as education tools, partnered with American education provider CK-12 Foundation providing high quality free mathematics and science learning content that can be used by teachers, students, schools and parents." CK-12 content would be installed on most of the company's devices; the company stated that installed content on tablets will allow students to learn at their own pace, regardless of their locations; also, this content may be updated at regular intervals.

Datawind announced content partnerships with The Indian Express Group and Yahoo!. According to this agreement the Ubislate 7+ and the Ubislate 7C will come with the Indian Express news application, and customers of these new tablets will receive a 50% discount on annual subscriptions of The Indian Express and The Financial Express. The tablets will also come with Yahoo! Cricket, the Yahoo! Mail application. Yahoo! India will be the default-browser homepage for the Ubislate 7+.

On December 3, 2013, Datawind partnered with IT firm Happiest Minds Technologies to develop applications for its UbiSlate range of tablets. Under the partnership, Happiest Minds will develop Datawind's app store, which will be designed for first-time Android users.

== Network operator partnerships ==
In July 2009, Datawind collaborated with Vodafone to offer a bundled SIM and GPRS modem within the price of its PocketSurfer devices, thus allowing free access to the Internet across the United Kingdom.

In December 2013, BSNL, one of India's largest network operators, entered a partnership with Datawind to offer its services on the company's tablets.

In March 2015, Datawind partnered with Reliance Communications to offer bundled, unlimited, internet browsing for one year with any of its devices.

In September 2015, Datawind entered a partnership with Telenor India, a global, mobile- network operator with major Indian operations, to offer unlimited internet browsing for one year on all Datawind devices.

== Partnerships for social causes ==
Datawind has partnered with a number of governments and non-governmental organizations(NGOs). Subsequent to the initial launch of the Aakash tablet for higher-learning institutions, Kapil Sibal, the Indian minister of human resources and development, announced that Aakash tablets will be provided free to all 220 million students in India over the next few years.

During the 2011 elections in Thailand, the Pheu Thai Party promised free tablets for all students, with numerous placards promising "One Tablet PC per Child". Analysts estimated that approximately 20 million units would be required. A senior figure said that the Pheu Thai party would fulfill its promise by importing the $35 Android tablets from India.

=== Contests ===
Datawind has sponsored a number of contests. On 29 November 2011, the Nasscom Foundation partnered with Datawind to announce a contest wherein 10 NGOs will have an opportunity to win 20 tablets each, mainly to improve their operations and program-implementation procedures. To win these tablets, the organizations had to showcase how they can best use the Aakash tablet for promoting education, health, and livelihood.

On 11 January 2013, Datawind and the United Nations, in partnership with Agnite Education, American Digital University, Applications for Good, BluWorld, Cat in Woods, and Equal Access International, launched a contest for developing socially responsible applications to empower women. The contest measured apps from the perspective of leadership and mentorship, jobs and entrepreneurship, and education and conflict resolution. The winners of the contest were the My Rights application, the Pictoson application, and the Talking English application.

=== Hackathons ===
To develop a new generation of software programmers who would focus on applications for humanitarian causes, Datawind regularly sponsors "hackathons". In 2012 and 2013, Datawind sponsored two "hackathons" with Geeks Without Bounds, an accelerator for humanitarian projects.

=== Non-governmental organizations (NGOs) ===
Datawind partners support a number of charitable and non-government organizations to deploy its technology for humanitarian causes.

On 23 October 2013, in an article published in The Washington Post, Chris Evans, a renowned philanthropist, donated 100 Aakash tablets to Raleigh schools in Wake County, North Carolina for its "Smart Summer" program—a summer camp that prepares disadvantaged African-American children for school. Ubislate tablets that contain science and mathematics applications proved to be effective learning tools.

Datawind also partnered with Virginia Advanced Study Strategies (VASS), a non-profit organization, to launch a contest in which six school districts enrolled 85 students in either of two coding courses to compete for a Datawind tablet by completing either course and developing an application.

In November 2013, Datawind and World Vision Canada collaborated to supply $40 tablets in African countries. As part of their ongoing field testing at the community level, World Vision used the Ubislate tablets in Niger and Rwanda to collect data at the project level to monitor change and to measure the impact and the effectiveness of their development in the areas of health, education to families, and aid to children in need.

== Products ==
=== PocketSurfer series ===
The PocketSurfer was Datawind's handheld, mobile-network-access device. The first version of the PocketSurfer was launched in 2004.

The device featured a QWERTY keyboard and a 5.3-inch (diagonal) screen. Reviews for the PocketSurfer had been mixed as PC Magazine's review of the product exclaimed that "it's the only device that lets you browse the web on a GPRS connection with any alacrity" and CNET in 2005 stated that it was impressed with PocketSurfer's page-load times.

In February 2007, at the 3GSM forum in Barcelona, Datawind introduced the improved "PocketSurfer 2". It was described as the world's fastest handheld Internet device. The sleek mobile device offered free mobile-internet access and provided a desktop-like experience with a 640-pixel-wide, color screen that displayed web pages with HTML, graphics, Java-Script, Ajax, Frames, and other complex, web functionality. The PocketSurfer 2 includes a built-in GPS receiver for location-based services with page-load times of less than seven seconds. Engadget referred to the original PocketSurfer devices as "Iconic".

In December 2013, on the tenth anniversary of the launch of the original PocketSurfer, the company entered the smartphone market with the launch of the PocketSurfer range of smartphones in India. Featuring 5" inch touchscreens, these dual-sim smartphones were available at an extremely low, price point. In reaction to the launch of the smartphone in India, The Economic Times exclaimed "Aakash maker Datawind enters smartphone market, breaks all price points!"

In March 2015, the company launched its range of low-cost smartphones, the PocketSurfer 2G4 and the PocketSurfer 3G4 with one year of free internet browsing on its proprietary UbiSurfer browser.

Datawind has partnered with Reliance Communication, one of the largest Telecom operators in the India to offer one year of free internet browsing along with its devices.

PocketSurfer Smartphone Range

	PocketSurfer 2G4	PocketSurfer 3G4	PocketSurfer 3G5
Networks	WiFi & EDGE	WiFi & 3G	WiFi & 3G
OS	Android 4.2.2 Jellybean	Android 4.4.2 KitKat	Android 4.4.2 KitKat
CPU	Cortex A7 - 1 GHz	Cortex A7 – 1 GHz	Cortex A7 – 1 GHz
RAM	256 MB	256 MB	512 MB
FLASH	512 MB	512 MB	4 GB
Camera	N/A	Front VGA/Rear 5 MP	Front VGA/Rear 3 MP
Screens	3.5" TFT Capacitive	4" TFT Capacitive	5" TFT Capacitive
Ports	Micro SD & Micro USB	Micro SD & Micro USB	Micro SD & Micro USB

=== UbiSurfer netbooks ===
The UbiSurfer is Datawind's range of netbooks. In April 2010, Datawind launched UbiSurfer netbooks in India. The UbiSurfer name is an amalgamated form of the two words, ubiquitous and surfing. The netbook offers mobile web browsing with an integrated modem and a SIM-card slot. The UbiSurfer supports both CDMA (1x) and GSM networks. The device offers Wi-Fi and LAN connectivity, an in-built cellular modem, and an embedded SIM card that allows access to the internet with a mobile-phone signal. The UbiSurfer is also equipped with an ARM processor that runs at 450 MHz with 128 MB RAM, 1 GB Flash memory, and up to 50 GB of online storage. The UbiSurfer has a seven-inch, bright TFT screen that supports a 800×480 pixel resolution. The device is also equipped with the UbiSurfer browser, which allows webpage delivery times of under seven seconds.

The UbiSurfer 9 was made available in India at a price of Rs. 7999, which also included a one-year free Internet browsing plan. On 7 April 2011, Datawind unveiled its new version of the mobile internet device, the UbiSurfer 9 3G, in London, England. This netbook offered users free Internet access in the UK and low cost roaming in Europe and USA. It had a nine-inch screen and weighed 700g, its free-usage model eliminated the user from any form of binding contracts, activation fees or credit checks.

=== Aakash tablets ===
In 2009, the National Mission on Education through Information Communication Technology (NME-ICT) initiative of the Indian Government cited that a lot could be done for education using information and communication technologies. An initiative by India's Ministry for Human Resource Development (MHRD) was launched to procure a low cost mobile web access device with built in features ensuring that technologies and content were accessible to everyone. In late 2011, Datawind won the Indian government tender to design the Aakash tablet computers with an initial trial run of 100,000 units. Upon its launch, The Wall Street Journal stated that the Aakash was the World's cheapest tablet.

On 5 October 2011, the Aakash was launched by Kapil Sibal, the then Minister of Human Resource and Development. Datawind designed, developed and manufactured this first version of Aakash on the specifications set by IIT Rajasthan. Its extremely low price garnered global attention and the tablet is known as the world's cheapest tablet device.

On 11 November 2012, President of India, Pranab Mukherjee launched the Aakash 2, an improved version of the Aakash tablet. This updated new version had a better processor based on the ARM Cortex A8 architecture and had a multi-touch projective capacitive screen in place of a resistive one. The Aakash 2 (Ubislate 7Ci) was considered the world's most cost effective web access device, it utilized a 1 GHz processor, of the same caliber as the original iPad, and contained 512 MB of RAM (twice that of the original iPad). The tablet supported a flash memory of 4 GB that can be supplemented by up to 32 GB with the use of a microSD card. In addition it was loaded with Wi-Fi supported connectivity and also an external 3G and an EVDO dongle for mobile broadband data. Other features included Google's Android 4.0 operating system, a VGA camera, G-sensors, an internal microphone, speakers and a headphone jack. The Aakash 2 is considered a full-featured tablet computer.

=== Ubislate tablets ===
The UbiSlates are a series of Android tablets with touch screens that are also capable of performing as smart-phones and are built for mobile web access, multimedia content, android games and applications. The UbiSlate tablet has a High-Definition video co-processor for high quality video and comes equipped with Datawind's UbiSurfer browser that accelerates web page delivery. The device includes WiFi & GPRS connectivity as well as allows for mobile internet access through SIM and Phone connectivity. Optional 3G modems are also supported via USB. In addition to a microSD card slot, a full-sized USB port is integrated into the unit allowing pen-drives, external keyboards, web-cams, dongles and other inexpensive accessories can also be attached.

On 26 April 2012 Datawind launched Ubislate 7+ and 7C tablets in India, in the same month the company declared that it had 3 million pre-bookings for Ubislate tablets. The commercial version of Aakash was released online as the UbiSlate7 tablet PC at INR 3000 (US$46) and the Ubislate 7c+ tablet PC at INR 3500 (US$54)^{[12][25]} on 11 November 2012 with plans to offer it at a subsidized cost for students of INR 1130 (US$17). In October 2013, Datawind launched UbiSlate 7Cx, UbiSlate 3G7 and UbiSlate 9Ci tablets in India.

In December 2013, Datawind officially launched three products from its range of UbiSlate Tablets in Canada, the United States and the United Kingdom.

Ubislate Tablet Range

	UbiSlate 10Ci	UbiSlate 3G10	UbiSlate 7C+	UbiSlate 7CZ	UbiSlate 9Ci	UbiSlate 3G7
Networks	WiFi & 3G	WiFi & 3G	WiFi & EDGE	WiFi & EDGE	WiFi	WiFi & UMTS (2100) & BT
OS	Android 4.4.2 Kitkat	Android 4.2.2 Jellybean	Android 4.2.2 Jellybean	Android 4.4.2 Kitkat	Android 4.4.2 Kitkat	Android 4.4.2 Kitkat
CPU	Cortex A9 - 1.1 GHz	Cortex A7 - 1.3 GHz	Cortex A5 - 1 GHz	Cortex A7 - 1.3 GHz	Cortex A7 - 1.2 GHz	Cortex A7 - 1.3 GHz
RAM	1 GB	1 GB	512 MB	512 MB	512 MB	1 GB
Flash	4 GB	8 GB	4 GB	4 GB	4 GB	4 GB
Cameras	Front VGA/Rear 2 MP	Front VGA/Rear 5 MP	Front VGA	Front VGA/Rear 2 MP	Front VGA/Rear VGA	Front VGA/Rear 2 MP
Screen	10.1" TFT Capacitive	10.1" TFT Capacitive	7" TFT Capacitive	7" TFT Capacitive	9" TFT Capacitive	7" TFT Capacitive
Ports	Micro SD & Micro USB	Micro SD & Micro USB	Micro SD & Micro USB	Micro SD & Micro USB	Micro SD & Micro USB	Micro SD & Micro USB
