= Personal Internet Communicator =

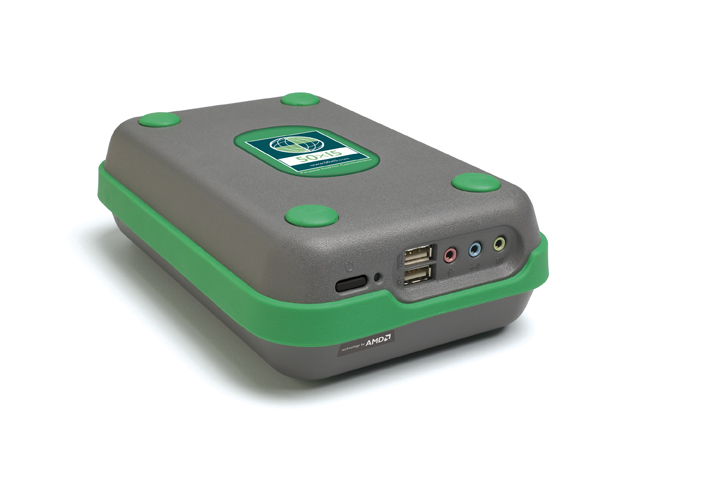
Personal Internet Communicator (also named decTOP)

The Personal Internet Communicator (PIC) is a consumer device released by AMD in 2004 as part of AMD's 50x15 initiative to expand Internet access in developing countries. The PIC was deployed by Internet service providers (ISPs) in several developing countries. It is based on an AMD Geode CPU (366 MHz AMD Geode GX500 x86 processor) and uses Microsoft Windows CE and Microsoft Internet Explorer 6. The PIC could only be upgraded by ISP's to reduce human error.

The device runs on Microsoft Windows CE 5.0 which allowed the unit to boot up in roughly 25 seconds. Windows CE 5.0. The device is no longer produced.

The fanless PC runs the low-power Geode x86 processor and is equipped with 128 MB DDR memory and a 10 GB 3.5-inch hard drive. The device's price is $185 with a keyboard, mouse, and preinstalled software for basic personal computing and internet/email access and $249 with a monitor included.

== Transfer to Data Evolution Corporation ==
AMD stopped work on the Personal Internet Communicator project after nearly two years of planning and development. In December 2006 AMD transferred PIC manufacturing assets to Data Evolution Corporation and the device was then marketed as the decTOP.

Local service providers, such as telecommunications firms and government-sponsored communications initiatives, brand, used to promote, and sell the PIC. AMD owns the design of the PIC, but the device was manufactured by Solectron (after 2006 till 2007) a high volume contract manufacturing specialist. Other companies integrated into the development include Seagate and Samsung. The ISPs include the Tata Group (India), CRC (México), Telmex (México), and Cable and Wireless (in the Caribbean). But these partnerships ended decades ago after development ceases to countinue

== Technology ==
=== Hardware ===
The device is designed for minimal cost like a consumer audio/video appliance, is not internally expandable, and comes equipped with a minimum set of interfaces which include a VGA graphics display interface, four USB 1.1 ports, a built-in 56 kbit/s ITU v.92 Fax/Modem and an AC'97 audio interface providing sound capabilities. There is also an IDE-connector and the case can house a normal 3.5" HDD.

==== Hardware specifications ====
- AMD Geode GX 500@1.0W processor, 366 MHz clock rate
- 128 MBytes DDR RAM (Up to 512 MBytes)
- VGA display interface up to 1600x1200
- four USB 1.1 ports
- 56 kbit/s ITU v.92 Fax/Modem
- AC'97 audio interface
- Fanless design.

==== Electrical specifications ====
- Input Voltage: 12 VDC (Factory provided AC/DC converter)
- Power Dissipation: 8 Watts (plus power supply's own dissipation)
- Total power Dissipation: 12.7 Watts @ 100% CPU Load

=== Software ===
==== Firmware ====
The decTOP's original BIOS does not allow any human interaction during POST at boot time. Therefore, it is not possible to format and re-install any other operating system. Any attempts to install a different OS, even when extracting the disk from the main chassis fail, since BIOS would look for WinCE's main boot file.

==== Operating system ====
AMD's PIC 50x15 was originally delivered with Windows CE 5.0 pre-installed in two partitions. The working (bootable) partition was allowed to boot normally, but when it failed, the BIOS would recover the partition's base-installation from a backup recovery disk in a small partition in the disk.

When re-flashed with a more forgiving BIOS, the decTOP allows the user to install any x86-compatible operating system desired (32 bits only). It is known to work with any Linux distribution, as well as Windows XP and other versions. However, upgrading the unit's main memory to 512 MBytes is recommended for reliable operation.

== See also ==
- OLPC XO-1
- Classmate PC
- VIA pc-1 Initiative
