= OLPC XS =

Linux distribution for small servers

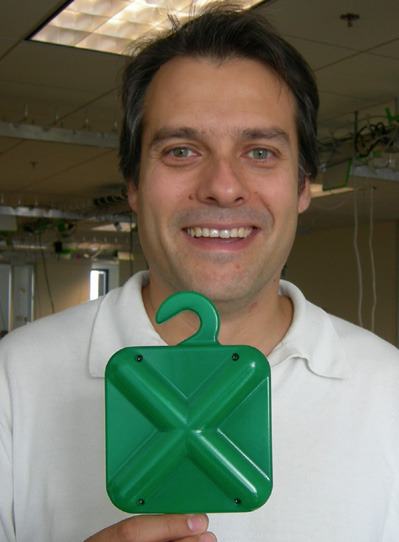
The OLPC Active Antenna will help build the mesh network.

The OLPC XS (often referred to as "School Server") is a Linux-based operating system (a Fedora-based distribution) developed by One Laptop per Child designed to be installed on generic lower grade servers intended for schools. Initial plans of building a custom server geared for the role have been postponed, OLPC however offers hardware recommendations for the system, and plans to support the XO laptops running as a server for very small schools.

OLPC XS can provide children's XO laptops and their Sugar Learning Platform with network connectivity for backups, anti-theft leases, web browsing, system, content updates, asynchronous collaboration tools such as Moodle, etc.

== Projected specifications ==
The (currently on hold) plans call for an energy-efficient design that does not require moving parts for basic functionality. It will be mildly ruggedized.

The XS Server's CPU is a PowerPC, the MPC7447A from Freescale, with AltiVec support.

The system will boot from flash memory, which is far less likely to fail than a hard disk. Hard disks will be provided for storing a library of local content and for making backups of the children's data. The XS is intended to ship with one hard disk installed, and a second to serve as either a spare or for increased capacity. The second is not installed by default because this would consume extra power.

There will be three 802.11s wireless mesh connections. Each will be a USB device with a 3-meter (10 foot) cable, allowing good antenna placement (high, unobstructed) and good server placement (dry, secure).
