= OLPC XO =

Laptop computer

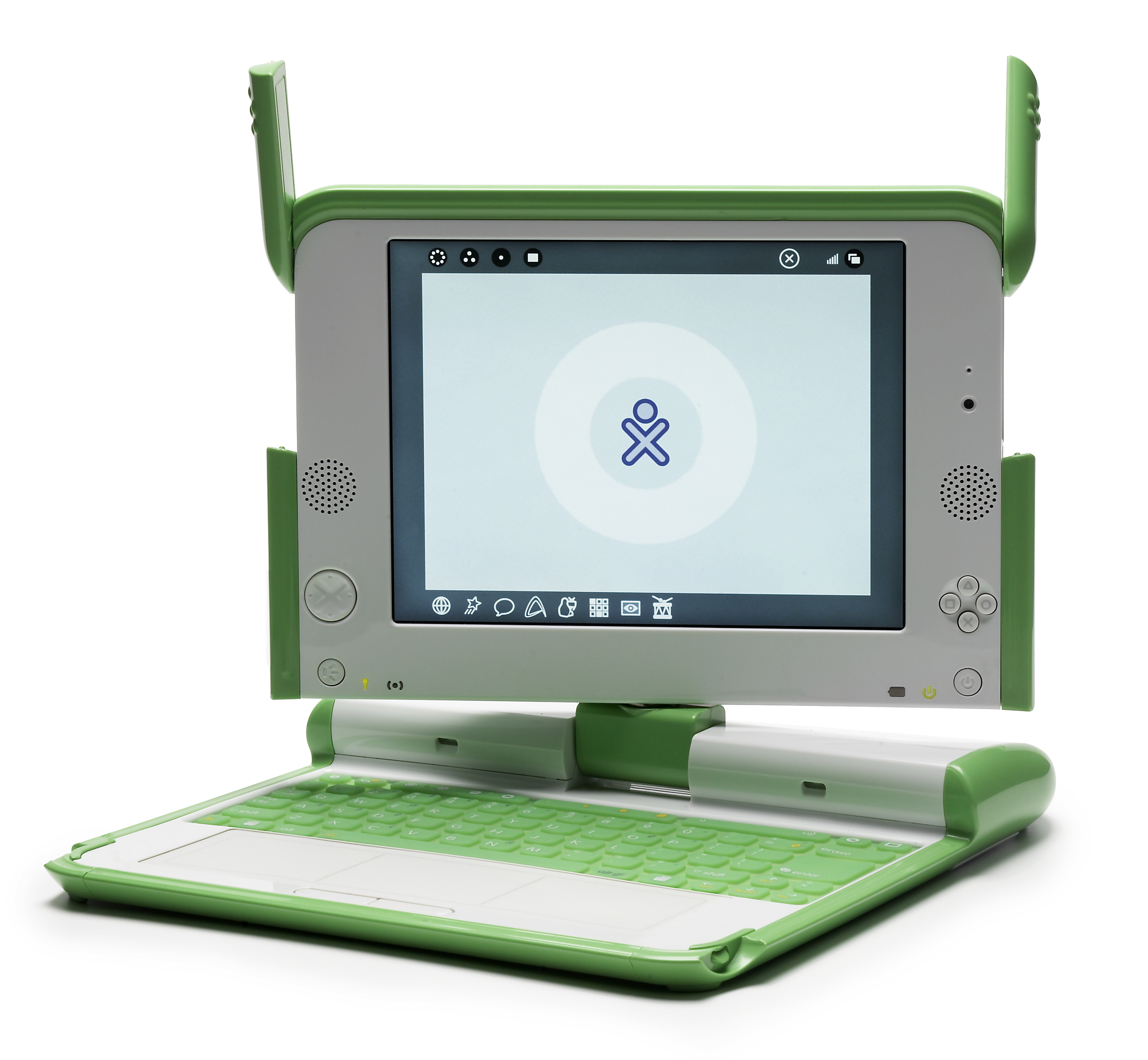
- An XO-1 prototype
- Manufacturer: Quanta Computer
- Type: Subnotebook
- Released: November 2007
- Media: 1 GB flash memory
- Operating system: Fedora-based (Linux) with Sugar GUI
- CPU: AMD Geode LX700@0.8 W + 5536
- Memory: 256 MB DRAM
- Display: dual-mode (backlit color, direct-sunlight grayscale) 19.1 cm (7.5 in) diagonal TFT LCD 1200×900
- Input: Keyboard, touchpad, microphone, camera
- Camera: built-in video camera (640×480; 30 FPS)
- Connectivity: 802.11b/g /s wireless LAN, 3 USB 2.0 ports, MMC–SD card slot
- Power: NiMH or LiFePO_{4} removable battery pack
- Dimensions: 242 mm × 228 mm × 32 mm (9.5 in × 9.0 in × 1.3 in)
- Weight: LiFePO_{4} battery: 1.45 kg (3.2 lb); NiMH battery: 1.58 kg (3.5 lb)
- Website: laptop.org

The OLPC XO (colloquially known as $100 Laptop, Children's Machine, 2B1) is a low cost laptop computer intended to be distributed to children in developing countries around the world, to provide them with access to knowledge, and opportunities to "explore, experiment and express themselves" (constructionist learning). The XO was developed by Nicholas Negroponte, a co-founder of MIT's Media Lab, and designed by Yves Behar's Fuseproject company. The laptop is manufactured by Quanta Computer and developed by One Laptop per Child (OLPC), a non-profit 501(c)(3) organization.

The subnotebooks were designed for sale to government-education systems which then would give each primary school child their own laptop. Pricing was set to start at US$188 in 2006, with a stated goal to reach the $100 mark in 2008 and the 50-dollar mark by 2010. When offered for sale in the Give One Get One campaigns of Q4 2006 and Q4 2007, the laptop was sold at $199.

The rugged, low-power computers use flash memory instead of a hard disk drive (HDD), and come with a pre-installed operating system derived from Fedora Linux, with the Sugar graphical user interface (GUI). Mobile ad hoc networking via 802.11s Wi-Fi mesh networking, to allow many machines to share Internet access as long as at least one of them could connect to an access point, was initially announced, but quickly abandoned after proving unreliable.

The latest version of the OLPC XO is the XO-4 Touch, which was introduced in 2012.

== History ==
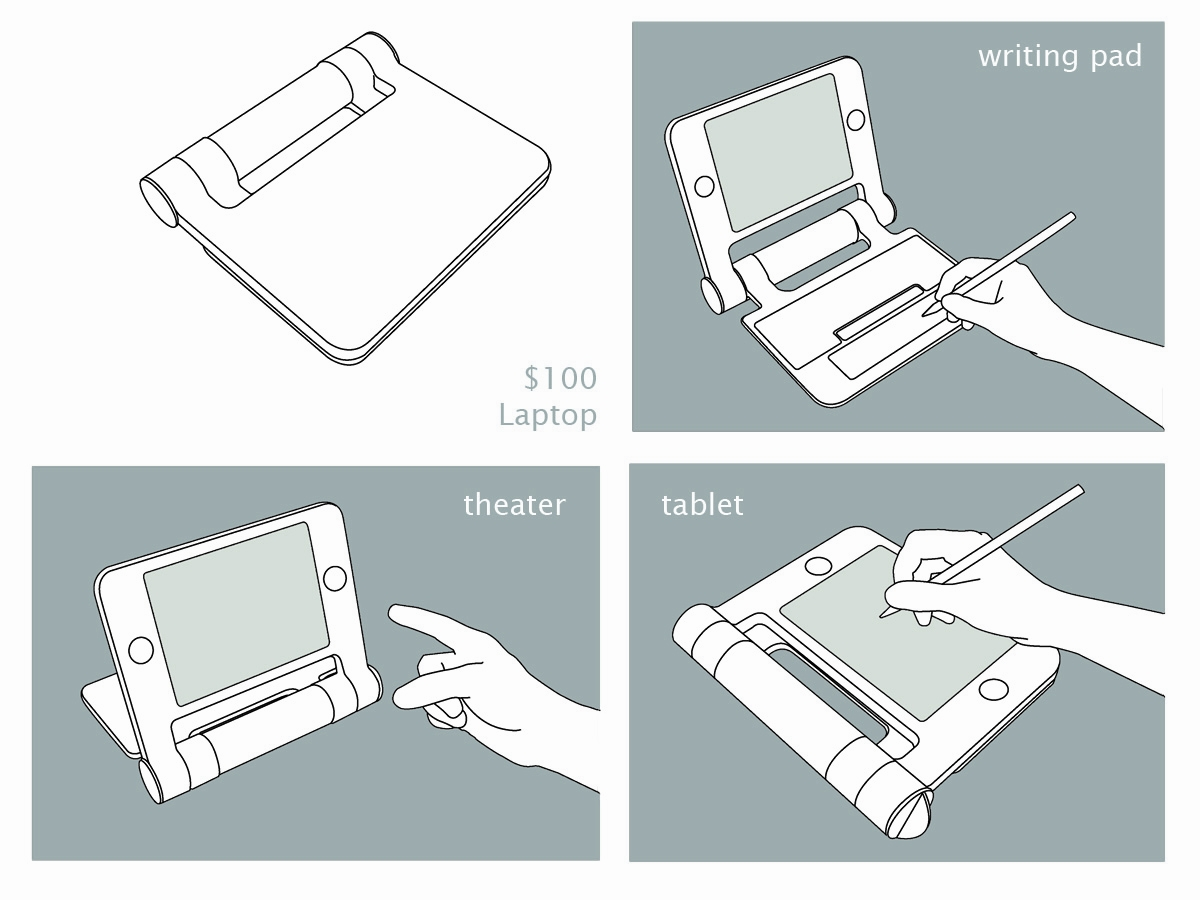
OLPC XO-1 original design proposal

The first early prototype was unveiled by the project's founder Nicholas Negroponte and then-United Nations Secretary-General Kofi Annan on November 16, 2005, at the World Summit on the Information Society (WSIS) in Tunis, Tunisia. The device shown was a rough prototype using a standard development board. Negroponte estimated that the screen alone required three more months of development. The first working prototype was demonstrated at the project's Country Task Force Meeting on May 23, 2006.

Steve Jobs had offered Mac OS X free of charge for use in the laptop, but according to Seymour Papert, a professor emeritus at MIT who is one of the initiative's founders, the designers wanted an operating system that can be tinkered with: "We declined because it's not open source." Therefore, Linux was chosen.

In 2006, Microsoft had suddenly developed an interest in the XO project and wanted the formerly open source effort to run Windows. Negroponte agreed to provide engineer assistance to Microsoft to facilitate their efforts. During this time, the project mission statement changed to remove mentions of "open source". A number of developers, such as Ivan Krstić and Walter Bender, resigned because of these changes in strategy. The version of Windows that ran on the XO was Windows XP.

Approximately 400 developer boards (Alpha-1) were distributed in mid-2006; 875 working prototypes (Beta 1) were delivered in late 2006; 2400 Beta-2 machines were distributed at the end of February 2007; full-scale production started November 6, 2007. Quanta Computer, the project's contract manufacturer, said in February 2007 that it had confirmed orders for one million units. Quanta indicated that it could ship five million to ten million units that year because seven nations had committed to buy the XO-1 for their schoolchildren: Argentina, Brazil, Libya, Nigeria, Rwanda, Thailand, and Uruguay. Quanta plans to offer machines very similar to the XO-1 on the open market.

The One Laptop Per Child project originally stated that a consumer version of the XO laptop was not planned. In 2007, the project established a website, laptopgiving.org, for outright donations and for a "Give 1 Get 1" offer valid (but only to the United States, its territories, and Canadian addresses) from November 12, 2007 until December 31, 2007. For each computer purchased at a cost of $399, an XO is also sent to a child in a developing nation. OLPC again restarted the G1G1 program through Amazon.com in November 2008, but has since stopped as of December 2008 or 2009.

On May 20, 2008, OLPC announced the next generation of XO, OLPC XO-2 which was thereafter cancelled in favor of the tablet-like designed XO-3. In late 2008, the New York City Department of Education began a project to purchase large numbers of XO computers for use by schoolchildren.

The design received the Community category award of the 2007 Index: Award.

In 2008 the XO was awarded London's Design Museum "Design of the Year", plus two gold, one silver, and one bronze award at the Industrial Design Society of America's International Design Excellence Awards (IDEAs).

== Goals ==
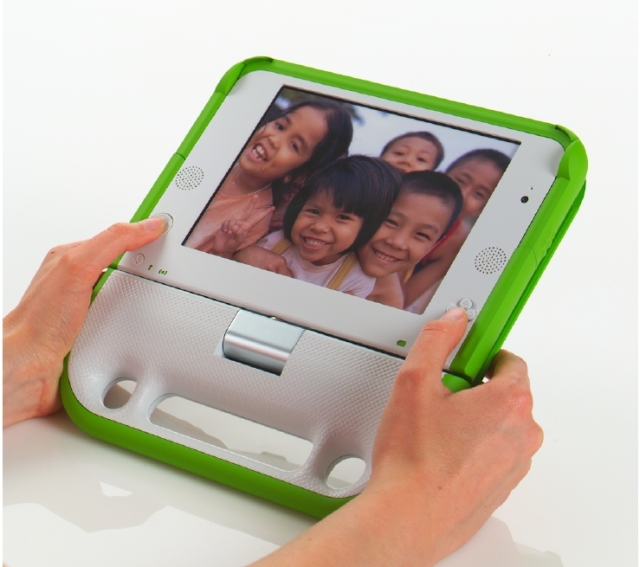
OLPC XO-1 laptop in e-book mode

The XO-1 is designed to be low-cost, small, durable, and efficient. It is shipped with a slimmed-down version of Fedora Linux and a custom GUI named Sugar that is intended to help young children collaborate. The XO-1 includes a video camera, a microphone, long-range Wi-Fi, and a hybrid stylus and touchpad. Along with a standard plug-in power supply, human and solar power sources are available, allowing operation far from a commercial power grid. Mary Lou Jepsen has listed the design goals of the device as follows:

- Minimal power use, with a design target of 2–3 Watts (W) total
- Minimal production cost, with a target of $100 per laptop for production runs of millions of units
- A "cool" look, implying innovative styling in its physical appearance
- E-book function
- Open source and free software provided with the laptop

In keeping with its goals of robustness and low power use, the design of the laptop intentionally omits all motor-driven moving parts; it has no hard disk drive, optical (compact disc (CD) or Digital Versatile Disc DVD) media, floppy disk drive, or fan (the device is passively cooled). No Serial ATA interface is needed due to the lack of hard drive. Storage is via an internal SD card slot. There is also no PC card slot, although Universal Serial Bus (USB) ports are included.

A built-in hand-crank generator was part of the notebook in the original design; however, it is now an optional clamp-on peripheral.

== Hardware ==
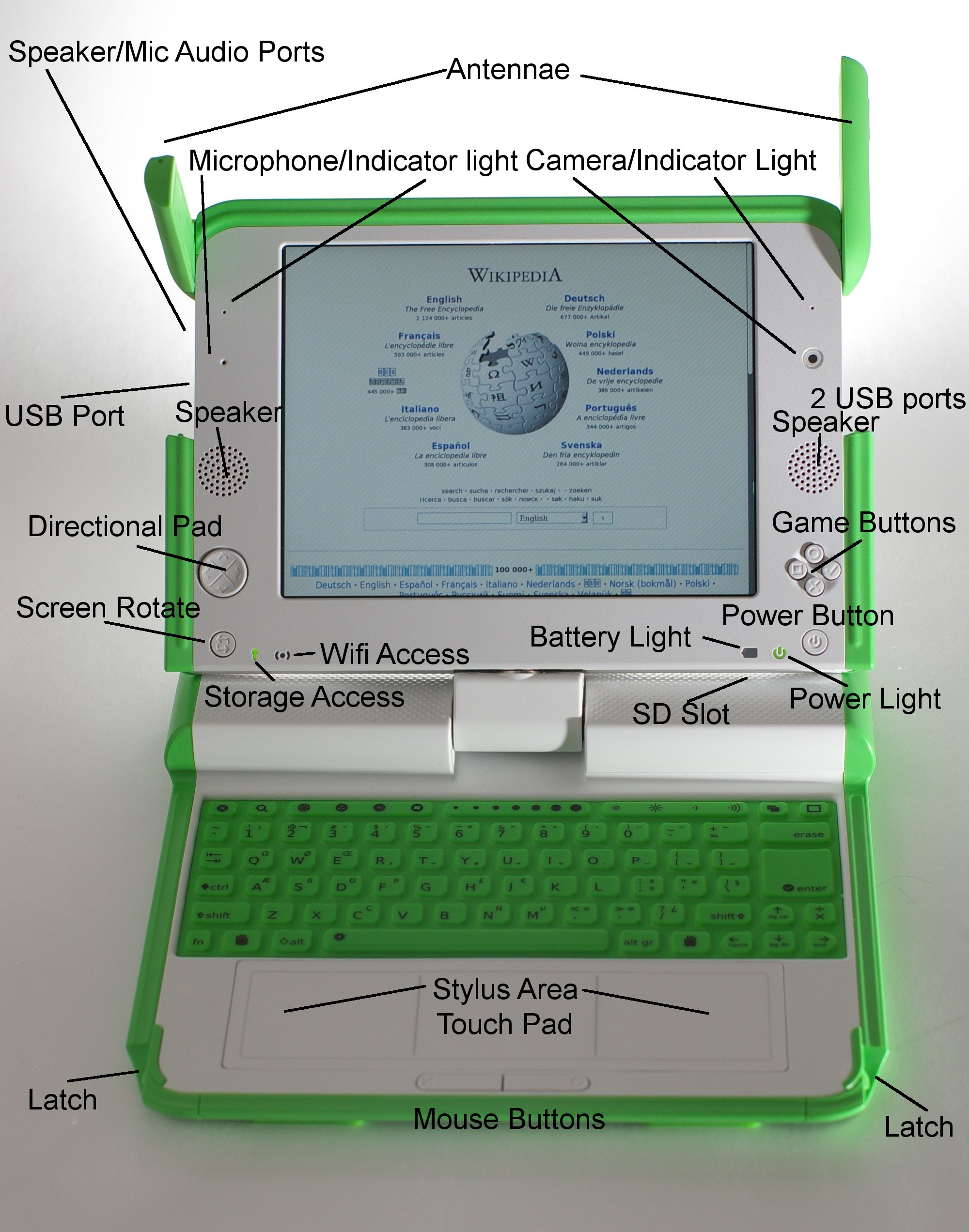
Production version (4th generation): functional survey

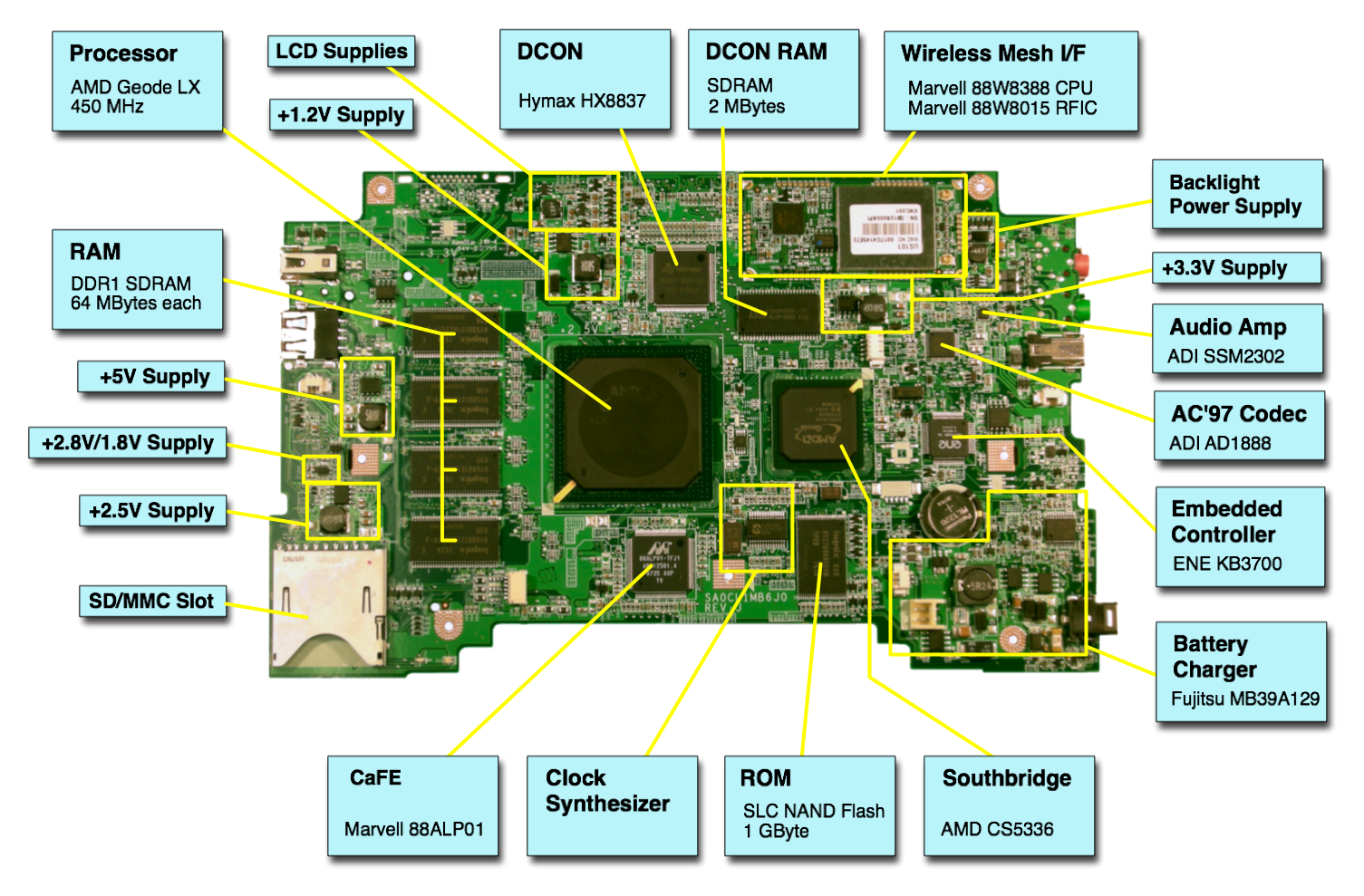
XO-1 motherboard

Marvell's IEEE 802.11 chipset runs an RTOS on an ARM9 and interfaces over a shim with the actual operating system

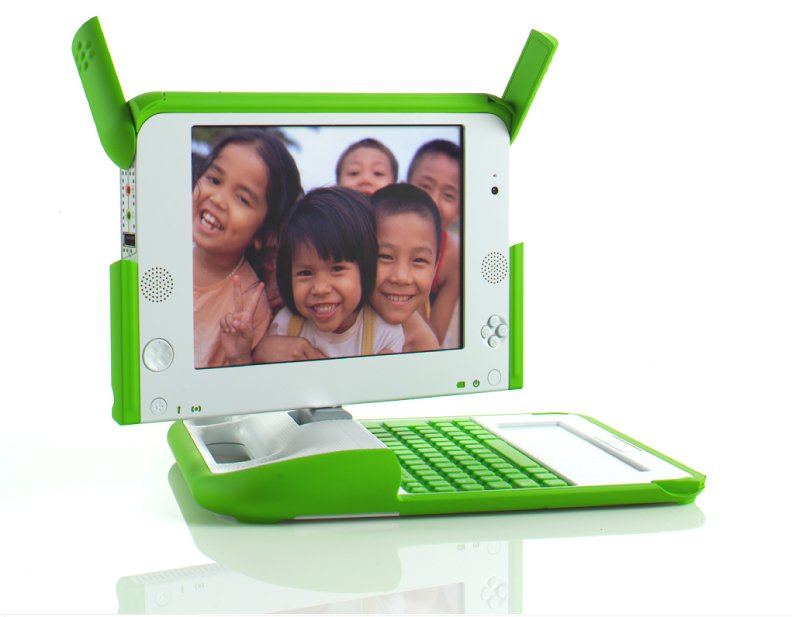
Rotatable display cover of the XO

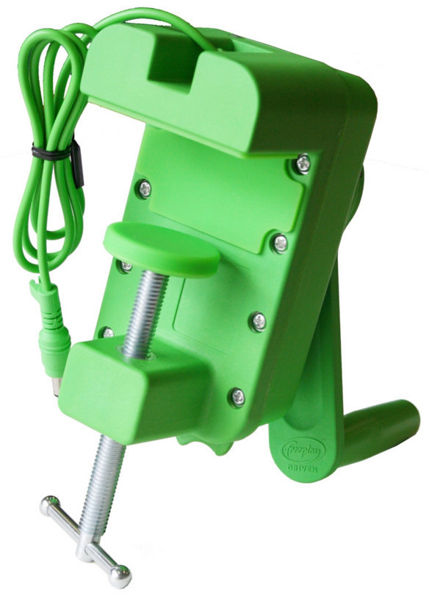
XO-1 clamp charger

=== Display ===
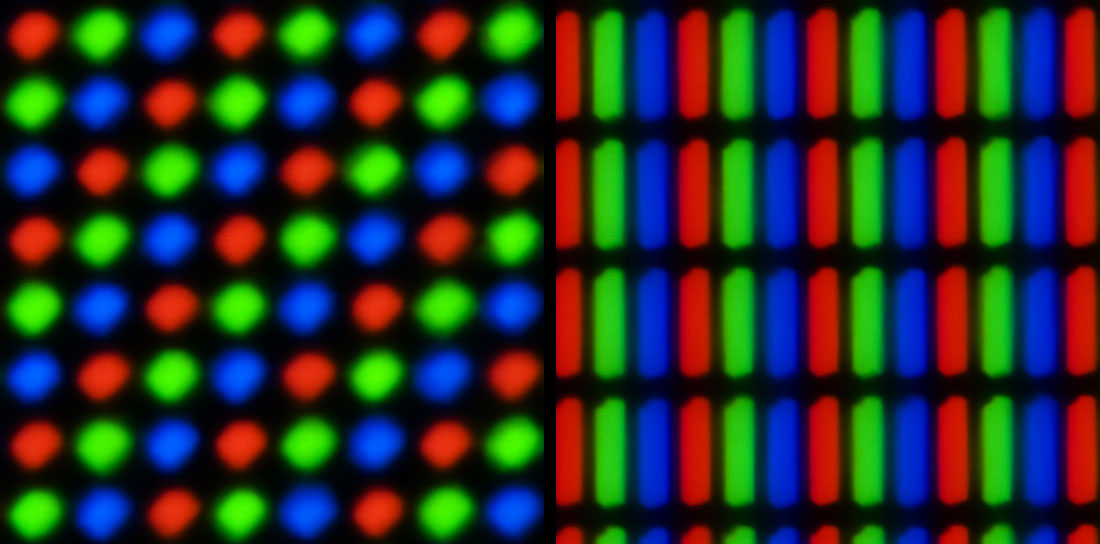
Comparison of the XO-1 display (left) with a typical liquid crystal display (LCD). The images show 1×1 mm of each screen. A typical LCD addresses groups of 3 locations as pixels. The OLPC XO LCD addresses each location as a separate pixel

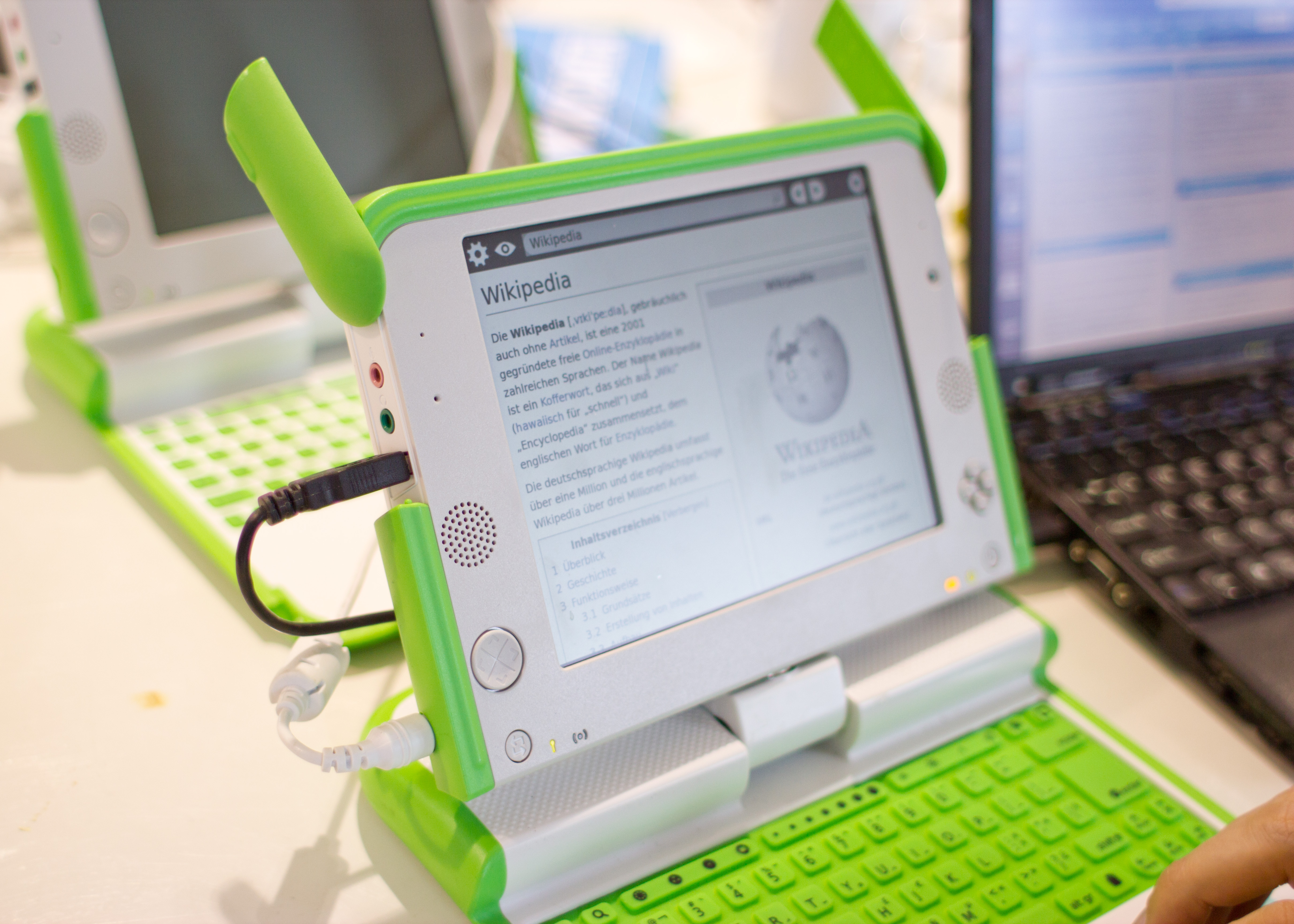
A transflective Pixel Qi screen installed in an OLPC XO laptop operating in reflective mode, note that the screen is in grey scale mode and is not retro illuminated

The first-generation OLPC laptops have a novel low-cost liquid crystal display (LCD). It has a 1200 × 900 7.5 inch (19 cm) diagonal transflective LCD (200 dpi) that uses 0.1 to 1.0 W depending on mode. There are two modes: Reflective (backlight off) monochrome mode for low-power use in sunlight. This mode provides very sharp images for high-quality text and Backlit color mode, with an alternance of red, green and blue pixels. The XO 1.75 developmental version for XO-3 has an optional touch screen.

The electronic visual display is the costliest component in most laptops. In April 2005, Negroponte hired Mary Lou Jepsen, who was interviewing to join the Media Arts and Sciences faculty at the MIT Media Lab in September 2008, as OLPC Chief Technology Officer. Jepsen developed a new display for the first-generation OLPC laptop, inspired by the design of small LCDs used in portable DVD players, which she estimated would cost about $35. In the OLPC XO-1, the screen is estimated to be the second most costly component, after the central processing unit (CPU) and chipset.

Jepsen has described the removal of the filters that color the RGB subpixels as the critical design innovation in the new LCD. Instead of using subtractive color filters, the display uses a plastic diffraction grating and lenses on the rear of the LCD to illuminate each pixel. This grating pattern is stamped using the same technology used to make DVDs. The grating splits the light from the white backlight into a spectrum. The red, green, and blue components are diffracted into the correct positions to illuminate the corresponding pixel with R, G or B. This innovation results in a much brighter display for a given amount of backlight illumination: while the color filters in a regular display typically absorb 85% of the light that hits them, this display absorbs little of that light. Most LCD screens at the time used cold cathode fluorescent lamp backlights which were fragile, difficult or impossible to repair, required a high voltage power supply, were relatively power-hungry, and accounted for 50% of the screens' cost (sometimes 60%). The light-emitting diode (LED) backlight in the XO-1 is easily replaceable, rugged, and low-cost.

The remainder of the LCD uses extant display technology and can be made using extant manufacturing equipment. Even the masks can be made using combinations of extant materials and processes.

When lit primarily from the rear with the white LED backlight, the display shows a color image composed of both RGB and grayscale information. When lit primarily from the front by ambient light, for example from the sun, the display shows a monochromatic (black and white) image composed of just the grayscale information.

"Mode" change occurs by varying the relative amounts backlight and ambient light. With more backlight, a higher chrominance is available and a color image display is seen. As ambient light levels, such as sunlight, exceed the backlight, a grayscale display is seen; this can be useful when reading e-books for an extended time in bright light such as sunlight. The backlight brightness can also be adjusted to vary the level of color seen in the display and to conserve battery power.

In color mode (when lit primarily from the rear), the display does not use the common RGB pixel geometry for liquid crystal computer displays, in which each pixel contains three tall thin rectangles of the primary colors. Instead, the XO-1 display provides one color for each pixel. The colors align along diagonals that run from upper-right to lower left (see diagram on the right). To reduce the color artifacts caused by this pixel geometry, the color component of the image is blurred by the display controller as the image is sent to the screen. Despite the color blurring, the display still has high resolution for its physical size; normal displays as of February 2007 put about 588(H) × 441(V) to 882(H) × 662(V) pixels in this amount of physical area and support subpixel rendering for slightly higher perceived resolution. A Philips Research study measured the XO-1 display's perceived color resolution as effectively 984(H) × 738(V). A conventional liquid crystal display with the same number of green pixels (green carries most brightness or luminance information for human eyes) as the OLPC XO-1 would be 693 × 520. Unlike a standard RGB LCD, resolution of the XO-1 display varies with angle. Resolution is greatest from upper-right to lower left, and lowest from upper-left to lower-right. Images which approach or exceed this resolution will lose detail and gain color artifacts. The display gains resolution when in bright light; this comes at the expense of color (as the backlight is overpowered) and color resolution can never reach the full 200 dpi sharpness of grayscale mode because of the blur which is applied to images in color mode.

=== Power ===
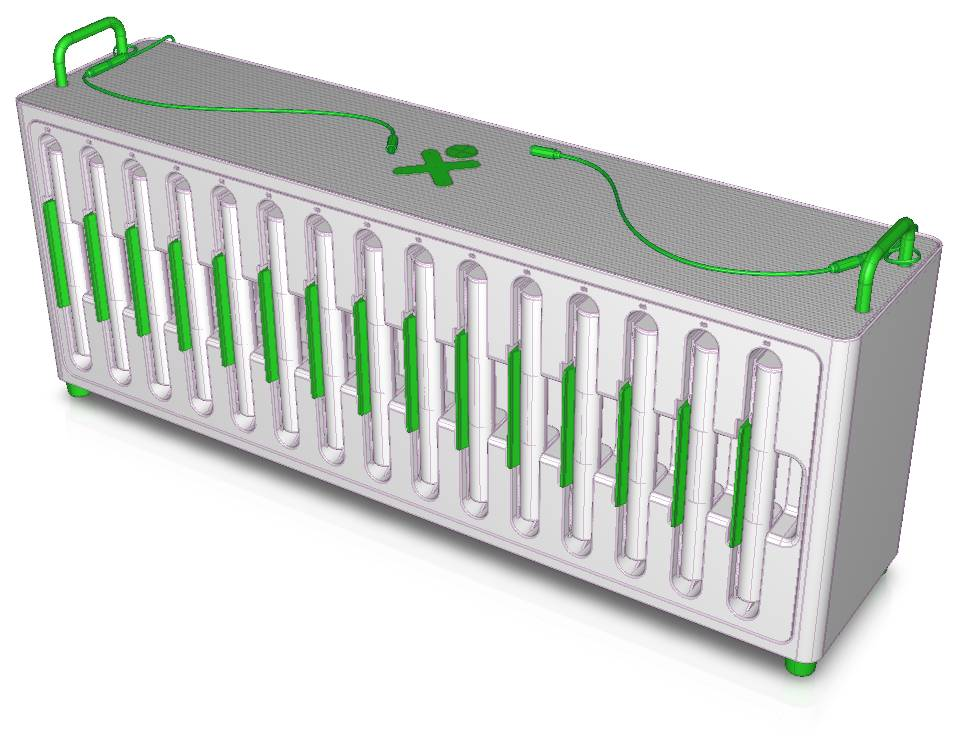
XO-1 multi-battery charger

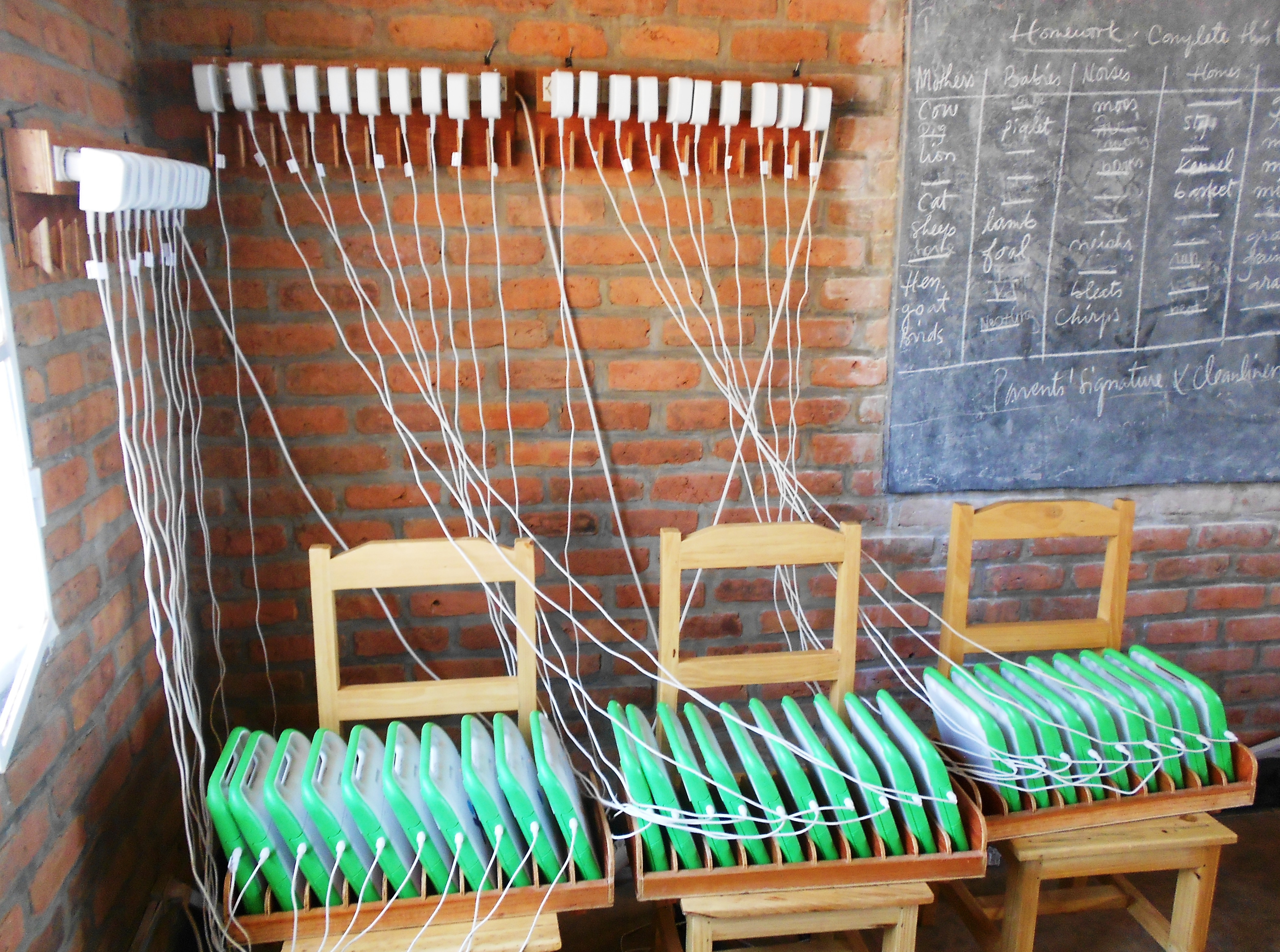
Selfmade laptop charging station in classroom

- DC input, ±11–18 V, maximum 15 W power draw
- 5-cell rechargeable NiMH battery pack, 3000 mAh minimum 3050 mAh typical 80% usable, charge at 0...45 °C (deprecated in 2009)
- 2-cell rechargeable LiFePO_{4} battery pack, 2800 mAh minimum 2900 mAh typical 100% usable, charge at 0...60 °C
- Four-cell rechargeable LiFePO_{4} battery pack, 3100 mAh minimum 3150 mAh typical 100% usable, charge at −10...50 °C
- External manual power options included a clamp-on crank generator similar to the original built-in one (see photo in the Gallery, below), but they generated 1/4 the power initially hoped, and less than a thousand were produced. A pull-string generator was also designed by Potenco but never mass-produced.
- External power options include 110–240 Volt AC and input from an external solar panel. Solar is the predominant alternate power source for schools using XOs.

The laptop design specification goals are about 2 W of power consumed during normal use, far less than the 10 W to 45 W of conventional laptops. With build 656, power use is between 5 and 8 watts measured on G1G1 laptop. Future software builds are expected to meet the 2-watt target.

In e-book mode (XO 1.5), all hardware sub-systems except the monochrome dual-touch display are powered down. When the user moves to a different page, the other systems wake up, render the new page on the display, and then go back to sleep. Power use in this e-book mode is estimated to be 0.3 to 0.8 W. The XO 2.0 is planned to consume even less power than earlier versions, less than 1.0 W in full color mode.

Power options include batteries, solar power panels, and human-powered generators, which make the XO self-powered equipment. 10 batteries at once can be charged from the school building power in the XO multi-battery charger. The low power use, combined with these power options are useful in many countries that lack a power infrastructure.

=== Networking ===
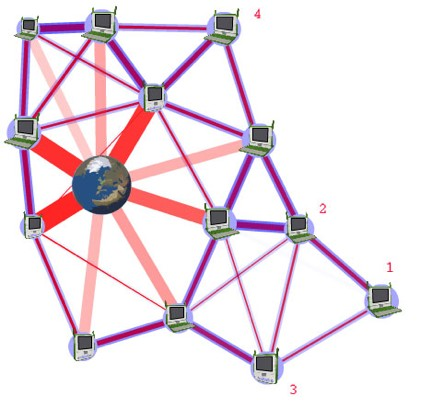
XO-1 Internet access through wireless mesh networking

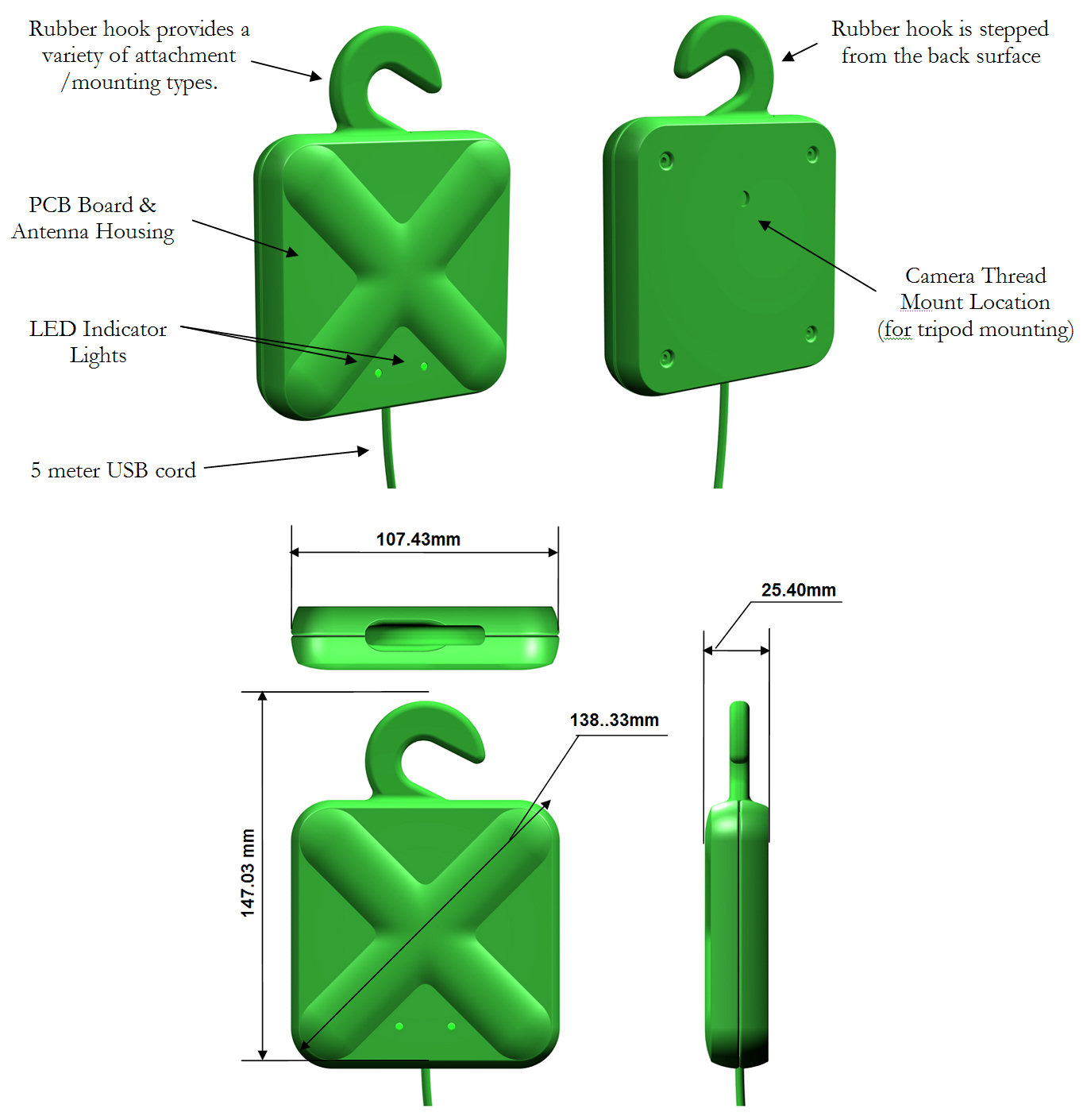
An "active antenna" for extending network reach

- Wireless networking using an "Extended Range" 802.11b/g and 802.11s (mesh) Marvell 8388 wireless chip, chosen due to its ability to autonomously forward packets in the mesh even if the CPU is powered off. When connected in a mesh, it is run at a low bitrate (2 Mbit/s) to minimize power use. Despite the wireless chip's minimalism, it supports Wi-Fi Protected Access (WPA). An ARM processor is included.
- Dual adjustable antennas for diversity reception.

IEEE 802.11b support will be provided using a Wi-Fi "Extended Range" chip set. Jepsen has said the wireless chip set will be run at a low bit rate, 2 Mbit/s maximum rather than the usual higher speed 5.5 Mbit/s or 11 Mbit/s to minimize power use. The conventional IEEE 802.11b system only handles traffic within a local cloud of wireless devices in a manner similar to an Ethernet network. Each node transmits and receives its own data, but it does not route packets between two nodes that cannot communicate directly. The OLPC laptop will use IEEE 802.11s to form the wireless mesh network.

Whenever the laptop is powered on it can participate in a mobile ad hoc network (MANET) with each node operating in a peer-to-peer fashion with other laptops it can hear, forwarding packets across the cloud. If a computer in the cloud has access to the Internet—either directly or indirectly—then all computers in the cloud are able to share that access. The data rate across this network will not be high; however, similar networks, such as the store and forward Motoman project have supported email services to 1000 schoolchildren in Cambodia, according to Negroponte. The data rate should be sufficient for asynchronous network applications (such as email) to communicate outside the cloud; interactive uses, such as web browsing, or high-bandwidth applications, such as video streaming should be possible inside the cloud. The IP assignment for the meshed network is intended to be automatically configured, so no server administrator or an administration of IP addresses is needed.

Building a MANET is still untested under the OLPC's current configuration and hardware environment. Although one goal of the laptop is that all of its software be open source, the source code for this routing protocol is currently closed source. While there are open-source alternatives such as OLSR or B.A.T.M.A.N., none of these options is yet available running at the data-link layer (Layer 2) on the Wi-Fi subsystem's co-processor; this is critical to OLPC's power efficiency scheme. Whether Marvell Technology Group, the producer of the wireless chip set and owner of the current meshing protocol software, will make the firmware open source is still an unanswered question. As of 2011, it has not done so.

=== Shell ===
Yves Béhar is the chief designer of the present XO shell. The shell of the laptop is resistant to dirt and moisture, and is constructed with 2 mm thick plastic (50% thicker than typical laptops). It contains a pivoting, reversible display, movable rubber Wi-Fi antennas, and a sealed rubber-membrane keyboard.

=== Input and ports ===
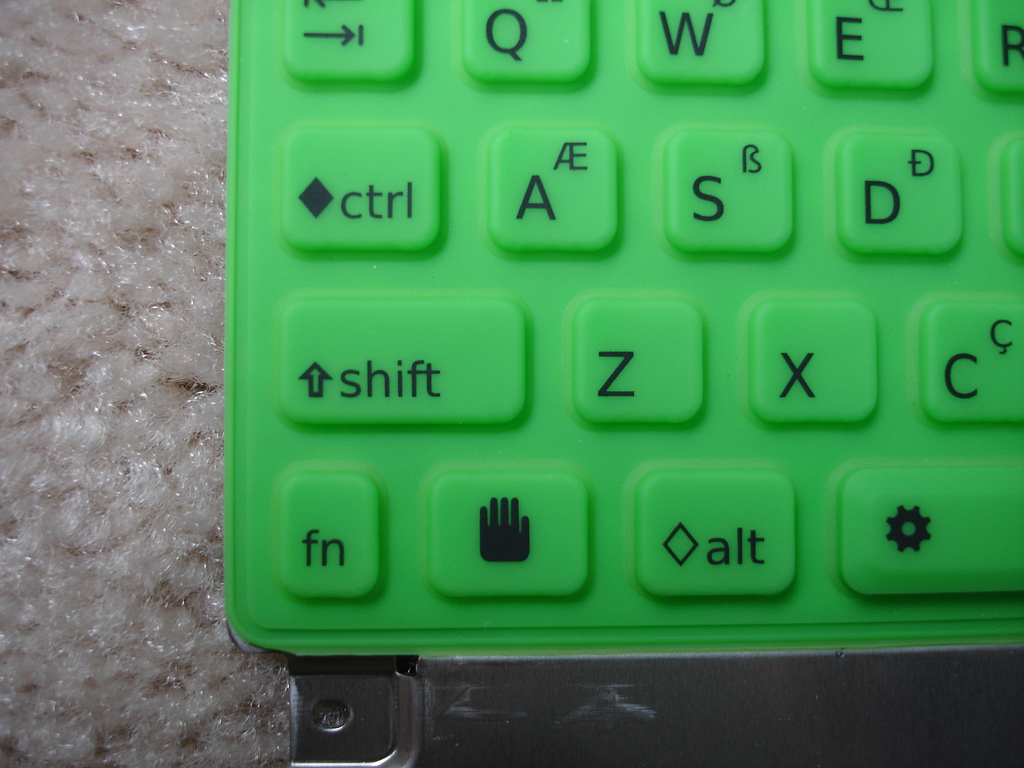
Close-up of the OLPC keyboard

- Water-resistant membrane keyboard, customized to the locale in which it will be distributed. The multiplication and division symbols are included. The keyboard is designed for the small hands of children.
- Five-key cursor-control pad; four directional keys plus Enter
- Four "Game Buttons" (functionally PgUp, PgDn, Home, and End) modeled after the PlayStation Controller layout (and).
- Touchpad for mouse control and handwriting input
- Built-in color camera, to the right of the display, VGA resolution (640×480)
- Built-in stereo speakers
- Built-in microphone
- Audio based on the AC'97 codec, with jacks for external stereo speakers and microphones, Line-out, and Mic-in
- Three external USB 2.0 ports.

More than twenty different keyboards have been laid out, to suit local needs to match the standard keyboard for the country in which a laptop is intended. Around half of these have been manufactured for prototype machines. There are parts of the world which do not have a standard keyboard representing their language. As Negroponte states this is "because there's no real commercial interest in making a keyboard". One example of where the OLPC has bridged this gap is in creating an Amharic keyboard for Ethiopia. For several languages, the keyboard is the first ever created for that language.

Negroponte has demanded that the keyboard not contain a caps lock key, which frees up keyboard space for new keys such as a future "view source" key.

Beneath the keyboard was a large area that resembled a very wide touchpad. The capacitive portion of the mousepad was an Alps GlidePoint touchpad, which was in the central third of the sensor and could be used with a finger. The full width was a resistive sensor which, though never supported by software, was intended to be used with a stylus. This unusual feature was eliminated in the CL1A hardware revision because it suffered from erratic pointer motion. Alps Electronics provided both the capacitive and resistive components of the mousepad.

=== Release history ===
The first XO prototype, displayed in 2005, had a built-in hand-crank generator for charging the battery. The XO-1 beta, released in early 2007, used a separate hand-crank generator.

The XO-1 was released in late 2007.

- Power option: solar panel.
- CPU: 433 MHz IA-32 x86 AMD Geode LX-700 at 0.8 watts, with integrated graphics controller
- 256 MB of Dual (DDR266) 133 MHz DRAM (in 2006 the specification called for 128 MB of RAM)
- 1024 kB (1 MB) flash ROM with open-source Open Firmware
- 1024 MB of SLC NAND flash memory (in 2006 the specifications called for 512 MB of flash memory)
- Average battery life three hours

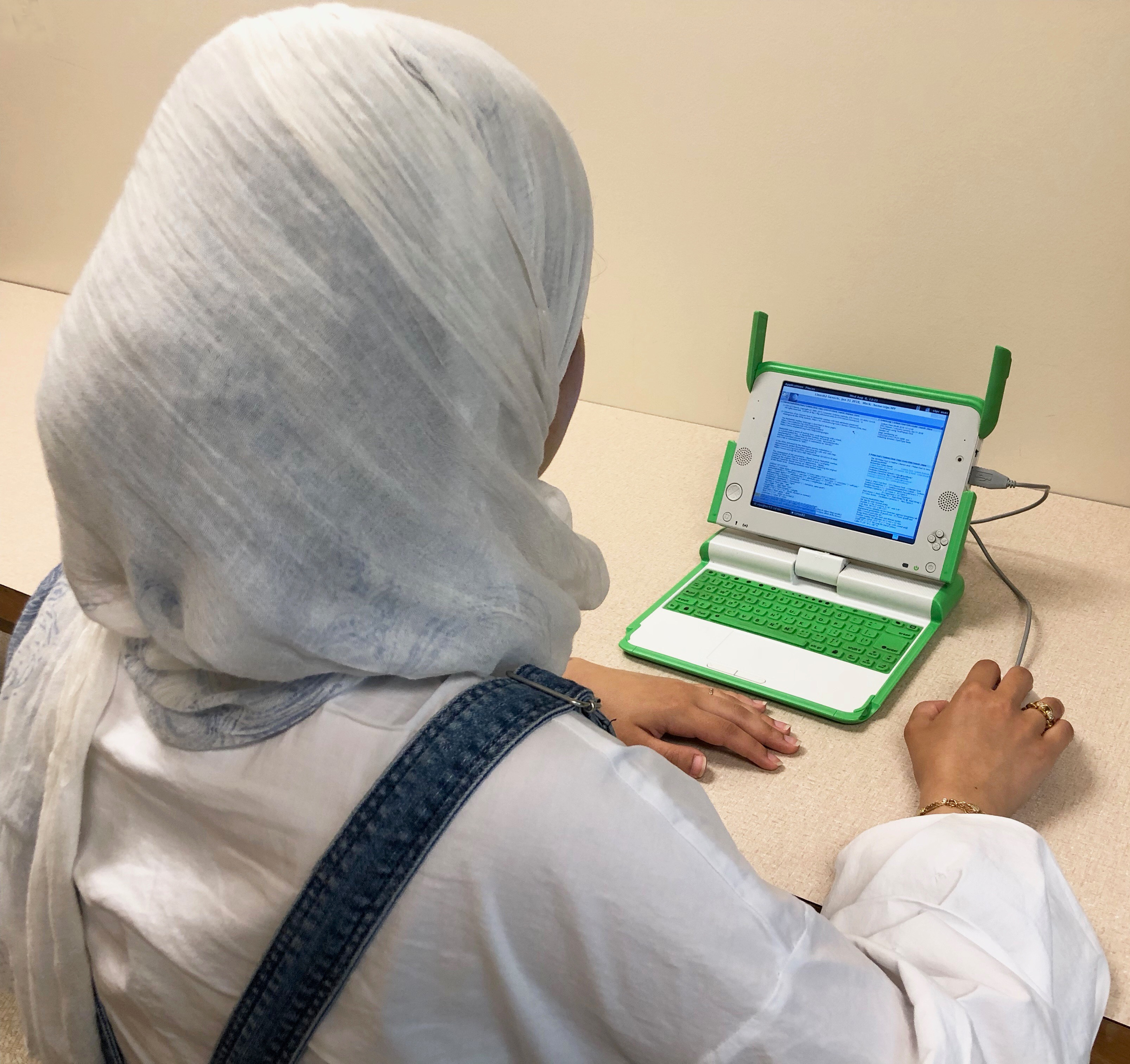
The Oberon subsystem in UnixAos on a XO-1.5.

The XO 1.5 was released in early 2010.

- Via/x86 CPU 4.5 W
- Fewer physical parts
- Lower power use
- Power option: solar panel.
- CPU: 400 to 1000 MHz IA-32 x86 VIA C7 at 0.8 watts, with integrated graphics controller
- 512 to 1024 MB of Dual (DDR266) 133 MHz DRAM
- 1024 kB (1 MB) flash ROM with open-source Open Firmware
- 4 GB of SLC NAND flash memory (upgradable, microSD)
- Average battery life 3–5 hours (varies with active suspend)

The XO 1.75 began development in 2010, with full production starting in February 2012.

- 2 watt ARM CPU
- Fewer physical parts, 40% lower power use.
- Power option: solar panel.
- CPU: 400 to 1000 MHz ARM Marvell Armada 610 at 0.8 watts, with integrated graphics controller
- 1024 to 2048 MB of DDR3 (TBD)
- 1024 TBD kB (1 MB) flash ROM with open-source Open Firmware
- 4-8 GB of SLC NAND flash memory (upgradable, microSD)
- Accelerometer
- Average battery life 5–10 hours

The XO 2, previously scheduled for release in 2010, was canceled in favor of XO 3. With a price target $75, it had an elegant, lighter, folding dual touch-screen design. The hardware would have been open-source and sold by various manufacturers. A choice of operating system (Windows XP or Linux) was intended outside the United States. Its $150 price target in the United States includes two computers, one donated.

The OLPC XO-3 was scheduled for release in late 2012. It was canceled in favor of the XO-4. It featured one solid color multi-touch screen design, and a solar panel in the cover or carrying case.

The XO 4 is a refresh of the XO 1 to 1.75 with a later ARM CPU and an optional touch screen. This model will not be available for consumer sales. There is a mini HDMI port to allow connecting to a display.

The XO Tablet was designed by third-party Vivitar, rather than OLPC, and based on the Android platform whereas all previous XO models were based on Sugar running on top of Fedora. It is commercially available and has been used in OLPC projects.

== Software ==
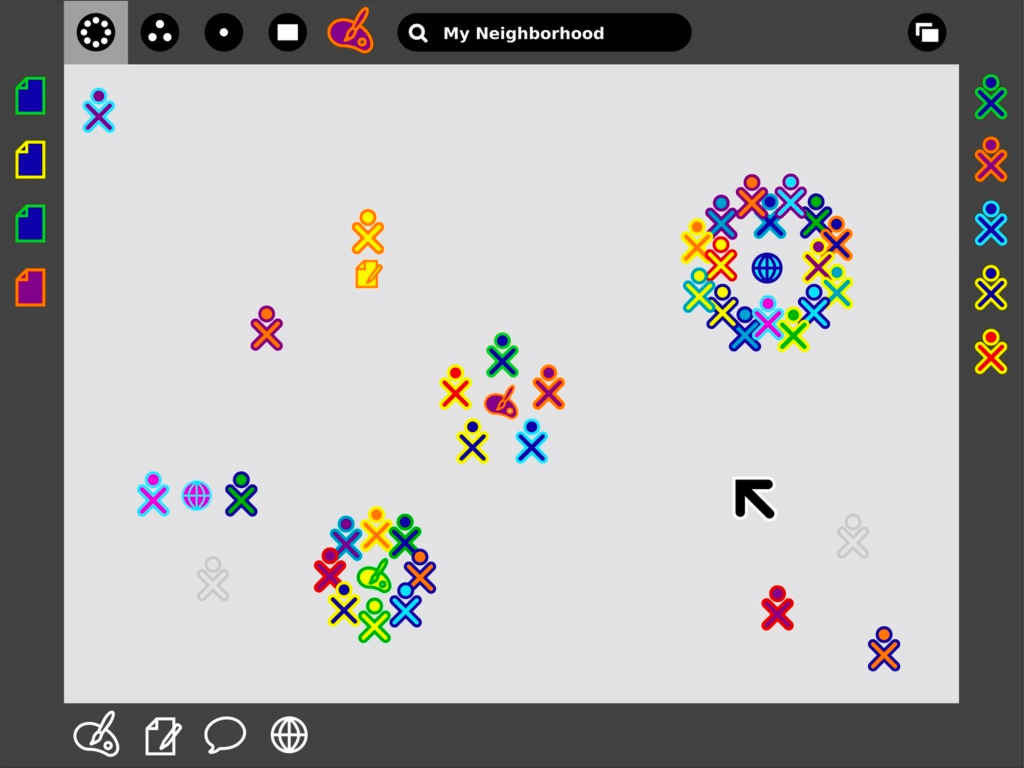
Mock-up of the "neighborhood view" showing children collaborating on various tasks, within the mesh network. By clicking on the icon, communication by Wi-Fi is activated

Countries are expected to remove and add software to best adapt the laptop to the local laws and educational needs. As supplied by OLPC, all of the software on the laptop will be free and open source. All core software is intended to be localized to the languages of the target countries. The underlying software includes:

- A pared-down version of Fedora Linux as the operating system, with students receiving root access (although not normally operating in that mode).
- Open Firmware, written in a variant of Forth
- A simple custom web browser based upon the Gecko engine used by Mozilla Firefox.
- A word processor based on AbiWord.
- Email through the web-based Gmail service.
- Online chat and VoIP programs.
- Python 2.5 is the primary programming language used to develop Sugar "Activities". Several other interpreted programming languages are included, such as JavaScript, Csound, the eToys version of Squeak, and Turtle Art
- A music sequencer with digital instruments: Jean Piché's TamTam
- Audio and video player software: Totem or Helix.

The laptop uses the Sugar graphical user interface, written in Python, on top of the X Window System and the Matchbox window manager. This interface is not based on the typical desktop metaphor but presents an iconic view of programs and documents and a map-like view of nearby connected users. The current active program is displayed in full-screen mode. Much of the core Sugar interface uses icons, bypassing localization issues. Sugar is also defined as having no folders present in the UI.

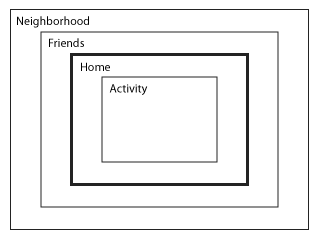
Activity, home, friends and neighborhood software levels

Jim Gettys, responsible for the laptops' system software, has called for a re-education of programmers, saying that many applications use too much memory or even leak memory. "There seems to be a common fallacy among programmers that using memory is good: on current hardware it is often much faster to recompute values than to have to reference memory to get a precomputed value. A full cache miss can be hundreds of cycles, and hundreds of times the power use of an instruction that hits in the first level cache."

On August 4, 2006, the Wikimedia Foundation announced that static copies of selected Wikipedia articles would be included on the laptops. Jimmy Wales, chair of the Wikimedia Foundation, said that "OLPC's mission goes hand in hand with our goal of distributing encyclopedic knowledge, free of charge, to every person in the world. Not everybody in the world has access to a broadband connection." Negroponte had earlier suggested he would like to see Wikipedia on the laptop. Wales feels that Wikipedia is one of the "killer apps" for this device.

Don Hopkins announced that he is creating a free and open source port of the game SimCity to the OLPC with the blessing of Will Wright and Electronic Arts, and demonstrated SimCity running on the OLPC at the Game Developer's Conference in March 2007. The free and open source SimCity plans were confirmed at the same conference by SJ Klein, director of content for the OLPC, who also asked game developers to create "frameworks and scripting environments—tools with which children themselves could create their own content."

The laptop's security architecture, known as Bitfrost, was publicly introduced in February 2007. No passwords will be required for ordinary use of the machine. Programs are assigned certain bundles of rights at install time which govern their access to resources; users can later add more rights. Optionally, the laptops can be configured to request leases from a OLPC XS central server and to stop working when the leases expire; this is designed as a theft-prevention mechanism.

The pre-8.20 software versions were criticized for bad wireless connectivity and other minor issues.

== Deployment ==
The XO-1 is nicknamed ceibalita in Uruguay after the Ceibal project.

== Reception and reviews ==
The hand-crank system for powering the laptop was abandoned by designers shortly after it was announced, and the "mesh" internet-sharing approach performed poorly and was then dropped. Bill Gates of Microsoft criticized the screen quality.

Some critics of the program would have preferred less money being spent on technology and more money being spent on clean water and "real schools". Some supporters worried about the lack of plans for teaching students. The program was based on constructionism, which is the idea that, if they had the tools, the kids would largely figure out how to do things on their own. Others wanted children to learn the Microsoft Windows operating system, rather than OLPC's lightweight Linux derivative, on the belief that the children would use Microsoft Windows in their careers. Intel's Classmate PC used Microsoft Windows and sold for US$200 to 400.

The project was known as "the $100 laptop", but it originally cost $130 for a bare-bones laptop, and then the price rose to $180 in the next revision. The solid-state alternative to a hard drive was sturdy, which meant that the laptop could be dropped with a lower risk of breaking—although more laptops were broken than expected—but it was costly, so the machines had limited storage capacity.

== See also ==
- Classmate PC
- Comparison of netbooks
- Computer technology for developing areas
- eMate 300
- Digital gap
- Lemote
- Linutop
- OLPC XO-3
- PlayPower
- Sakshat
- Sinomanic
- VIA pc-1 Initiative
- Zonbu
