= VIA pc-1 Initiative =

The VIA pc-1 Initiative is a project of VIA Technologies, established in January 2005, to help bridge the digital divide by developing information and communication technology (ICT) systems to benefit those who currently do not have computers or Internet access.

== Aims ==
The project sought to increase individual PC and Internet access for those who could afford it, and community access for those who couldn't, via community access deployments in schools, offices, libraries, Internet cafes, village kiosks, and telecenters. The project also sought to enable PC and Internet access in remote regions. In January 2006 a development center was opened in Mumbai.

== Design concepts ==
The system platform architecture includes processors built by IBM using a 90-nanometer silicon on insulator (SOI) process with a VIA digital media chipset.

== Systems ==
VIA provides reference designs, but vendors use different brand names. Examples include iDot pc-1 systems in Taiwan, Longmeng pc-1 systems in China, Geniac pc-1 systems in Nigeria, Sico pc-1 systems in Egypt, and Alaska pc-1 systems in Mexico.

The pc1000 and pc1500 platforms were described in 2006, using the VIA C3 processors. The pc3500 was introduced in August 2007 using the VIA C7.

VIA platform	VIA chipset	VIA processor	frequency
pc1000	CLE266	C3	800 MHz
pc1500	CLE266	C3	1 GHz
pc1500E	CLE266	Eden	1 GHz
pc2500	CN700	C7-D	1.5 GHz
pc2500 Mobile	CN700	C7-M	1.5 GHz
pc3500	CN896	C7-D	1.5–1.8 GHz

== Projects ==
As a part of the pc-1 Initiative, VIA became involved in digital inclusion projects. These include working alongside the Geekcorps in Mali to design a computer for hot dusty conditions, as well as donating low-powered computers for use in Mali desert radio stations.

VIA worked with the Asia-Pacific Economic Cooperation (APEC) Digital Opportunity Center (ADOC) to bridge the digital divide in emerging markets within Pacific Rim countries. One project includes donating 20 systems for use in the VIA pc-1 ICT Center at the Thai Nguyen University of Agriculture and Forestry (TUAF) in the Northern Mountainous Area (NMA) of Vietnam. VIA worked with ADOC and the Institute for Information Industry (Taiwan) on an affordable computing advocacy project.

VIA works with the Samoan Ministry of ICT to establish Samoa's first solar powered information center, arranging for solar cells and computers to be provided.

In South Africa, VIA worked with Ikamvayouth in several projects - most recently providing computers and thin clients for a tuXlab IT center at the Nazeema Isaacs Library in Khayelitsha.

== See also ==
- One Laptop per Child, also called "$100 Laptop Project" or "XO-1"
- Classmate PC, from Intel World Ahead program
- Personal Internet Communicator
- Simputer
