= Sugar Labs =

Community-run software project

- Formation: May 15, 2008; 18 years ago
- Type: NGO and Non profit organization
- Purpose: Educational
- Headquarters: Boston, Massachusetts, USA
- Region served: Worldwide
- Members: Contributors approved via community consensus
- President: Walter Bender
- Staff: 0
- Volunteers: 100+
- Website: www.sugarlabs.org

Sugar Labs is a community-run software project whose mission is to produce, distribute, and support the use of Sugar, an open source desktop environment and learning platform. Sugar Labs was initially established as a member project of the Software Freedom Conservancy, an umbrella organization for free software projects, but in 2021, it became an independent 501(c)(3) organization.

About every six months, the Sugar Labs community releases a new version of the Sugar software. The most recent stable release is available as a Fedora Linux spin. Through on-going support from Nexcopy's RecycleUSB program, Sugar Labs provides Sugar on a Stick to elementary schools.

The Sugar Labs community participates in events for teachers, students, and software developers interested in the Sugar software, such as the Montevideo Youth Summit and Turtle Art Day.

Sugar Labs has participated in Google Code-in, which served as an outlet for young programmers. Sugar Labs is a long-time participant in Google Summer of Code.
