= Ivan Krstić =

Croatian computer security expert (born 1986)

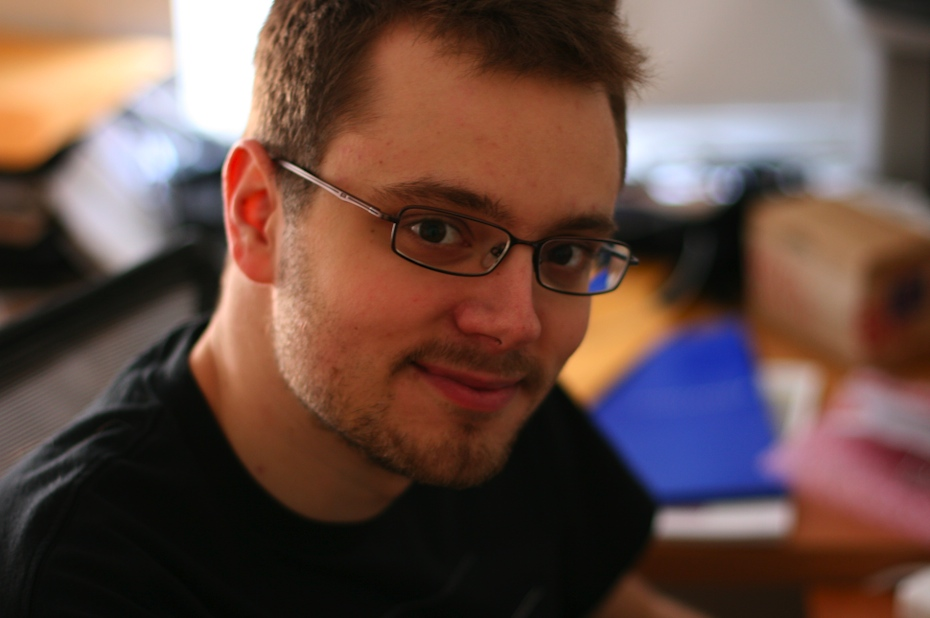
- Born: 1986 (age 39–40); Zagreb, Croatia
- Education: Harvard College
- Employer: Apple, Inc.
- Known for: Bitfrost

Ivan Krstić is a Croatian computer security expert, currently working on core security at Apple Inc. Krstić was previously the director of security architecture at One Laptop per Child. He is a co-author of The Official Ubuntu Book (ISBN 978-0-13-243594-9).

== Biography ==
Born in Croatia, Krstić received a scholarship to attend the Cranbrook Kingswood school in Michigan, U.S, when he was 15. In 2004, he enrolled at Harvard College but took a year's leave to work on secure electronic healthcare at Croatia's largest children's hospital. After returning to Harvard in 2005, he took another leave when offered a position with One Laptop per Child. While there, he designed the Bitfrost security architecture and personally oversaw the project's first two in-country deployments, in Uruguay and Peru. He left the project in early 2008 and later joined Apple in May 2009.

== Recognition ==
In 2007, Krstić became a TR35 laureate, selected by the MIT Technology Review as one of the world's top 35 innovators under the age of 35. A year later, eWeek magazine declared him one of the top three most influential people in modern computer security, and one of the top 100 in all of IT.
