= Classmate PC =

Low-cost personal computer

- Developer: OEM
- Type: Subnotebook/Netbook
- Media: 1 GB (Linux only), 2 GB, 4 GB, 8 GB, 16 GB, 32 GB flash memory, 30 GB HDD
- Operating system: Windows XP Professional; Mandriva Linux 2010; Metasys Classmate 2.0 for the Classmate PC, Microsoft Innovation Suite 1.0, 2.0, 2.5
- CPU: Intel Atom Mobile Processor N270, N455
- Memory: DDR-II 256 MB (Linux only) or 512/1024 SO-DIMM DDR-III 1 GB SO-DIMM
- Display: 7" or 8.9" or 10.1"; 800 × 480 color LCD
- Input: Keyboard; Touchpad
- Camera: yes
- Connectivity: 10/100 Mbit/s Ethernet WLAN 802.11b/g with antenna, mesh 802.11s support
- Power: 4/6-cell Li-ion battery
- Dimensions: 245 mm × 196 mm × 44 mm
- Weight: 1.3 kg [2.9 pounds]

The Classmate PC, formerly known as Eduwise, is Intel's entry into the market for low-cost personal computers for children in the developing world. It is in some respects similar to the One Laptop Per Child (OLPC) trade association's Children's Machine (XO), which has a similar target market. Although made for profit, the Classmate PC is considered an Information and Communication Technologies for Development project (ICT4D). Introduced in 2006, the device falls into the then popular category of netbooks.

Intel's World Ahead Program was established May 2006. The program designed a platform for low cost laptops that third-party manufacturers could use to produce low cost machines under their own respective brands. Many orders were cancelled in 2009.

The Classmate PC is a reference design by Intel. Intel did not build the subnotebooks, but produced the chips that power them. The reference design was used by original equipment manufacturers (OEMs) worldwide to build their own branded Classmate PC.

== Classmate PC (Clamshell, first generation) ==
The reference hardware specifications as of September 28, 2006 are:

- Customized mini chassis 245 mm × 196 mm × 44 mm
- CPU: Intel Celeron M mobile processor (915GMS + ICH6-M)
- CPU clock speed 900 MHz (with 32 KB L1 cache, no L2 cache, and 400 MHz FSB)

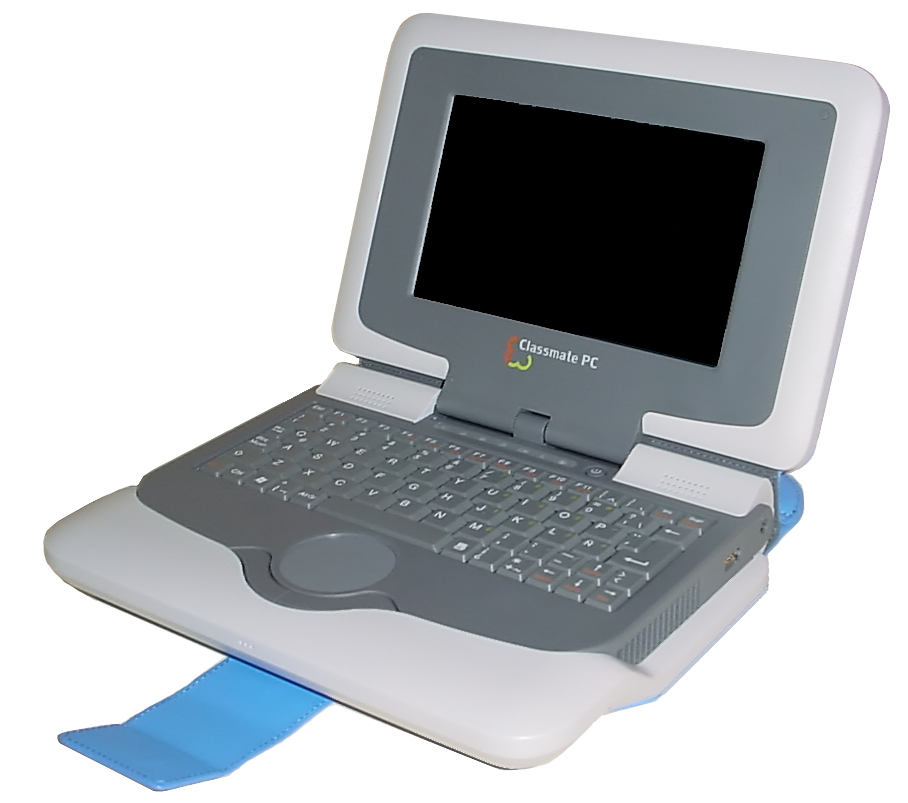
Intel Classmate PC

- 800 × 480 7-inch diagonal LCD, LVDS Interface, LED B/L
- 256 MB of DDR2 RAM
- 1 GB/2 GB flash memory (connected via USB)
- 10/100 Mbit/s Ethernet
- Realtek WLAN 802.11b/g with antenna (connected via USB)
- Intel GMS915 integrated graphics chip (8 MB shared memory)
- Built in microphone
- Built in stereo speakers
- Stereo 2 channel audio, jacks for external stereo speakers and microphones, Line-out, and Mic-in
- Integrated keyboard with hot keys
- Cycle touch pad with left and right buttons
- Customized Note Taker with wireless pen
- TPM1.2 (Trusted Platform Module from Infineon Technologies or Nuvoton) used for the Intel anti-theft technology feature (discontinued in 2015)
- Power source:
  - 4-cell Li-ion battery with adapter – approximately 3.5 hours usage
  - 6-cell Li-ion battery option – approximately 5 hours usage

There was a consumer model called MiLeap X, build by HCL Infosystems, India.

== Second generation (Convertible) ==
The successor of the original Classmate design was announced in April 2008 and reviewed. Later on, different photos of the successor leaked. Photos of Classmate PC 3 as a tablet PC are available. The second generation Classmate was unveiled on 3 April 2008 at Intel's Developer Forum. Significant upgrades include:

- Available 30 GB PATA hard disk drive (in addition to 1, 2, and 4 GB SSD).
- Built-in webcam
- Available 9" LCD (the 7" LCD is still available)
- Up to 512 MB RAM
- 802.11s (mesh networking, currently only usable on Linux-based Classmates)
- Available 6-cell battery for up to 6.5 hours usage
- Touchscreen – pen and on-screen soft keyboard
- Tablet mode – simple user-interface shell; quick launcher for tablet mode
- Enhanced software – easier network connection and collaboration simple computer management, and localized, education-friendly content

== Third generation (Convertible) ==
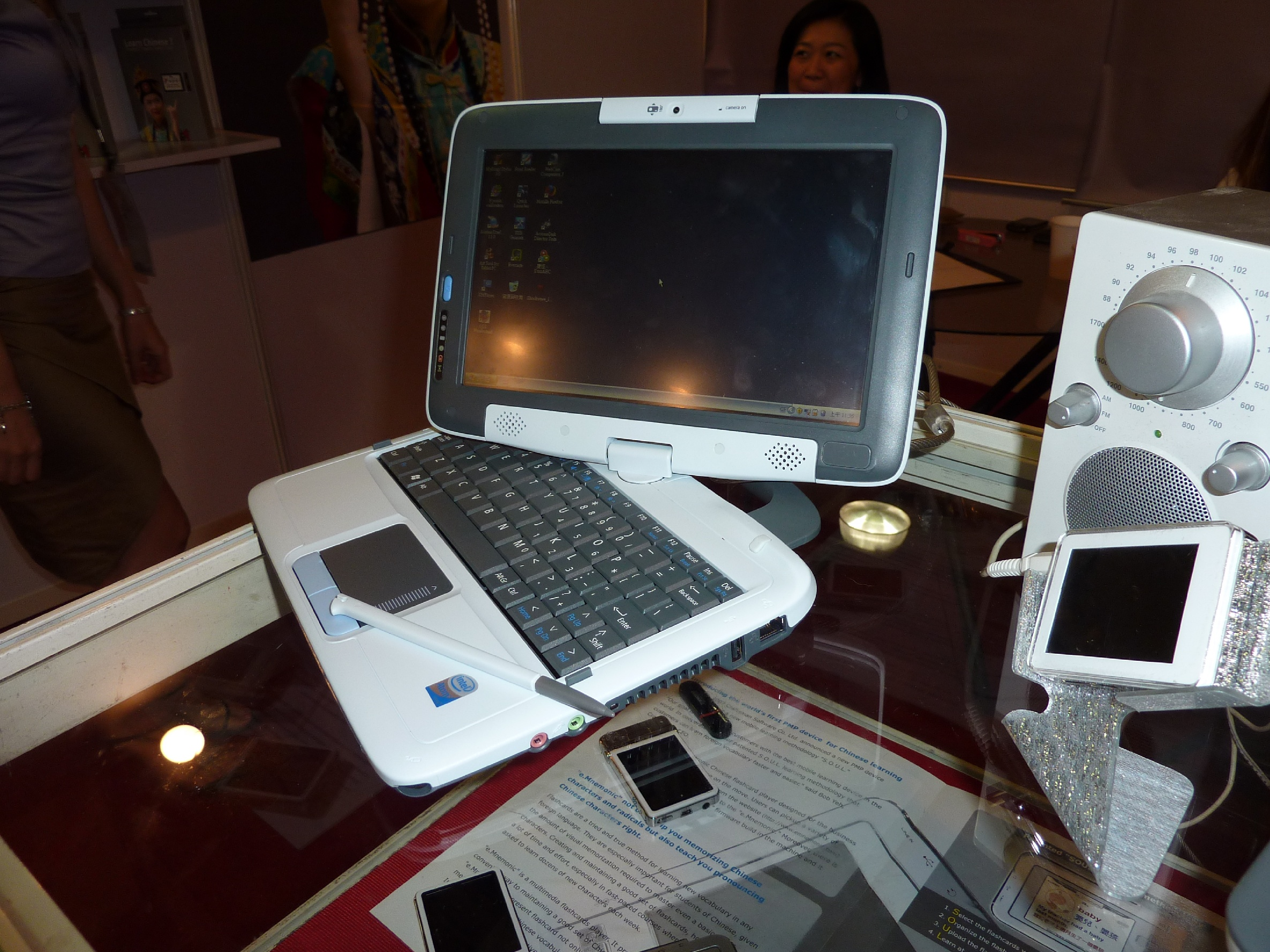
Third generation of the Classmate PC

On Computex 2009, Intel presented the third generation of the Classmate PC. It comes with a camera and an accelerometer.

== Intel-Powered Convertible Classmate PC ==
The Intel-Powered Convertible Classmate PC had its official release at CES in January 2009 and was aimed at students, teachers, and parents. The Convertible Classmate can be converted from a traditional laptop to a tablet PC to allow children to write and draw more naturally. This model was designed by TEAMS Design Shanghai and won several design awards such as the Appliance Design EID Award, 2008 Spark Award and IF 2008 China Award. The initial model includes the following:

- Dual mode: tablet mode and traditional laptop mode
- When open like a traditional laptop, the screen swivels 180 degrees for easier sharing
- 1.6 GHz Intel Atom processor
- 1 GB RAM (2 GB max.)
- 60 GB hard disk drive (PATA 1.8", ZIF socket)
- 8.9 inch touch screen & advanced palm-resting technology
- Allows for writing or drawing directly on the screen
- Built-in camera rotates 180° to enable students to interact in a new way
- Portability: Carrying handle, lightweight and compact size
- Water-resistant keyboard
- Education-specific features and touch-optimized software
- SD card reader; documentation says that you can boot the system off an SD card, or a standard USB thumbdrive
- Comes with either Windows XP installed (standard) or Windows XP Professional (an extra US$186 on the 2go)

=== Software ===
Intel announced that its device would run Linux or Windows XP Professional. Intel is not using Windows XP Embedded as initially planned. Intel has been actively working with various Linux distributions in various countries.

Intel has worked with Mandriva to customize their Linux distribution for Classmate PC.

Currently, the Intel powered classmate PC has been shown to run the following Linux distributions:

- Mandriva Linux (International & Pan-European Linux operating system)
- Metasys (International Syst in Brazil)

=== Latin America ===
In Latin America, contingent upon the receipt of sufficient international fund monies, the Mexican and Brazilian governments are evaluating whether to buy Intel's or the OLPC's laptop. Regardless of the hardware chosen, the Brazilian government announced that it would use the Linux operating system. It has been confirmed that Intel will be shipping the laptops with Mandriva Linux, Discovery 2007 edition as well as the Classmate 2.0 Linux distribution by the Brazilian company Metasys.

In 2008 the Venezuelan government ordered one million Classmates from Portugal, one of several bilateral deals that Portuguese officials valued at more than US$3 billion.

Oscar Clarke, president of Intel of Brasil, delivered thirty production units to the Brazilian Ministry of Education (MEC), for evaluation by SERPRO (Federal Data Processing Service of Brazil).

It is currently available in Argentina made by 10 different brands of manufacturers with OS like Linux Rxart and Windows also in Paraguay through HITECER S.A - TROVATO CISA GROUP with Rxart Linux by the Argentinian company Pixart. About the end of 2009, Argentina's government planned to give all the public high school students one of these netbooks in this edition Rxart Linux. US$740 million will be used to give all public schools routers and infrastructure to reduce the digital gap around the country.

In 2011, Mexico retracted its bid to buy several million Classmate PCs and instead selected a specialized variant of the Mexican-built Lanix LT laptop series running Windows 7 and Linux Rxart to equip students in 16,000 schools across the country.

In Panama, in 2011 and 2012 during the presidency of Ricardo Martinelli, the government via the ministry of education (MEDUCA) purchased around 93 thousand Intel Classmate PCs from Intel, made by Portuguese company Magalhaes/JP Sa Couto and branded as Balboa. They were given to middle and high school students in the 9th to 12th grades of school.

in Argentina, province of La rioja in 2021. the government gave to 4,5,6, and 7 graders students/teachers of primary schools around a thousand of intel classmate PC.

=== Africa ===
In Africa, Intel has also started shipping to Libya as part of its deal of supplying 150,000 units.

In Seychelles, Classmate PC were supplied to primary schools as part of Sheikh Khalifa ICT project Seychelles 2010. In Kenya, Intel has partnered the distributors of Mecer products Mustek E.A who have worked with other government and non-government organizations to distribute the Classmate PC to rural areas.

=== Asia ===
In 2009, State Government of Terengganu with cooperation from (Top IT Industries Sdn Bhd) and Intel Malaysia introduces CMPC through local brand TC (known as Top IT now) in Terengganu as e-book to replace the traditional text book in primary school all around Terengganu. First batch of E09 model landed on Terengganu in March 2009 and till now the State Government still providing CMPC to primary school students for free. Ranging from E09 (2009), E10 (2010) and the latest model E11 (2011 - till now) is given to give boost to ICT literacy to school children.

In Asia, it has been available in Indonesia since early March 2008, through two local brands: Axioo and Zyrex. The Zyrex brand, called Anoa, is a rebranded Classmate PC equipped with the Intel ULV 900 MHz (400 MHz FSB) processor, 512 MB RAM, 2 GB SSD, Wi-Fi, LAN, 7 inch screen, 2× USB ports, card reader. The Classmate PC is available in Linux or Windows XP operating system, with the XP version incurring extra cost to cover the licensing.

The Classmate PC is currently available in India as Connoiseur Electronics Pvt.Ltd., Smartbook & Classmate PC series. This comes with Windows or Ubuntu Linux OS pre-installed.

In late 2007, a deal was made with the Vietnamese government to supply local schools with a special Classmate PC for discounted price. As this version is loaded with Hacao Linux, the government was able to avoid operating system licensing fees.

=== Europe and USA ===
The second generation of the device will be available in Europe and United States, in the hope that more sales will drive down the price.

Current generation are available from CTL (computers) in the United States under CTL's 2goPC brand as the 2go Classmate PC E10IS, the 2go Classmate PC E11 and the 2go Convertible Classmate PC NL2.

Classmate PC is available from CMS Computers and RM Education in the United Kingdom and most other European nations.

On May 20, 2008, Italian company Olidata announced the release of a modded version of the Classmate PC named Jumpc. This version was first on sale in Italy, but by the end of the year it was also available in many European countries.

On July 31, 2008, Intel, JP Sá Couto (the producer of the Tsunami Portuguese computers) and the Portuguese Government headed by Prime Minister José Sócrates announced the production of the "Magalhães" (a tribute to Portuguese navigator Magellan), an Intel Classmate-based computer that will be produced in Portugal (by JP Sá Couto) and distributed to Portuguese children in primary education for €50 (free or at €20 for students on social aid), as well as being exported to other countries.

Intel Classmate PC (the 7" version) is available in Greece, and sold as the InfoQuest "Quest Classmate", with a blue-coloured exterior. Its specifications include 2 GB storage, Windows XP Professional, no hard drive, no camera, and SD card support. It is sold by various retailers, including MediaMarkt.

Serbian leading IT company "COMTRADE" from April 2009 will introduce "ComTrade CoolBook" netbook (Classmate PC), they already donated 30 netbook's to one Belgrade elementary school.

=== Canada ===
The Intel Classmate series in Canada is available through MDG Computers under the following brand names:

- The Intel Clamshell second generation is called the MDG Mini 8.9" Rugged Netbook PC
- The Intel Convertible third generation is called the MDG Flip 8.9" Touchscreen Netbook PC

== Comparisons with OLPC project ==
The Classmate PC represents Intel's competitive response to the OLPC XO, whose unusually low prices and use of AMD chips threatened to steal market share from Intel and other major manufacturers. Although Intel initially criticized the XO laptops for their lack of functionality—Intel's chairman of the board, Craig Barrett, himself claimed consumers wanted the full functionality of a PC—the Classmate PCs are currently being heavily marketed against the XO worldwide. Intel had already secured deals to sell hundreds of thousands of Classmate PCs to Libya, Nigeria and Pakistan, the same developing countries the OLPC project had been targeting.

The goals of the Classmate PC project and the OLPC project have some differences. According to Intel: the Classmate PC aims to provide technology that fits into the larger, primarily Windows-based computing environment. However, according to the OLPC, the XO breaks from the desktop metaphor to provide a UI (Sugar) that they feel is more suited to the educational needs of children.

While the OLPC uses hardware and software highly customized for the educational environment, Intel has argued that the developing world wants to have generic PCs. In December 2005, Intel publicly dismissed the XO as a 'gadget'.

Intel joined the OLPC project in July 2007 and was widely expected to work on a version of the project's laptop that used an Intel chip, only to pull out of the project in January 2008. Intel spokesman Chuck Mulloy said it had pulled out because the OLPC organization had asked it to stop backing rival low-cost laptops, while OLPC's founder Nicholas Negroponte has accused Intel of underhand sales tactics and trying to block contracts to buy his machines.

=== Technical comparison ===
	Classmate PC	OLPC XO-1	OLPC XO-1.5
Processor	Intel Atom N270 1.6 GHz or Intel Celeron M 900 MHz processor	AMD Geode LX700@0.8 W + 5536	Via C7-M (1 GHz) ULV CPU Via VX855 northbridge / southbridge companion chip for peripheral I/O, embedded controller for system monitoring, ISA compatibility: Support for both the MMX and SSE x86 instruction-set extensions
Display	8.9" 1024 × 600 color LCD 7" 800 × 480 color LCD 8.9" 1024 × 600 touch screen	Low-power, sunlight readable, user replaceable LED backlight, low cost manufacturing process; 800 × 600 px (color mode), 1200 × 900 px (black and white mode) 7.5-inch LCD	7.5 in (19 cm) color/monochrome dual-mode TFT LCD, 1200x900 (200dpi) Viewing area: 152.4 mm × 114.3 mm; (6 in × 4.5 in), sunlight readable, dedicated display controller (with separate 2 MB SGRAM frame buffer) supports use of display when CPU is powered down, solid state (LED) backlight
Memory	1 GB / 512 MB DDR-II 256M (Linux only) or 512 MB SO-DIMM tech specs	256 MB RAM	1 GB DDR2 SDRAM system memory, running at 400 MHz
Operating systems	1. Rxart (Argentina only); 2. Mandriva Linux Discovery 2007; 3. Metasys Classmate 2.0; 4. Ubuntu Education Edition for the ClassmatePC; 5. Windows XP Professional	1. Customized, low resource version of open-source Fedora with the Sugar GUI and mesh networking 3. Customized, low resource version of open-source Ubuntu Linux with bundled open-source education applications 4. Customized, low resource version of proprietary Microsoft Windows XP without mesh networking for US$10/laptop	Fedora 11 base with Sugar 0.84 and GNOME 2.26
Storage	16 GB / 8 GB / 4 GB Flash (1.8" HDD), 1 GB (Linux only), 2 GB, 4 GB Flash, 30 GB HDD	1024 MB SLC NAND flash, high-speed flash controller	4 GB of NAND flash memory on motherboard 1 MB of serial flash memory provided separately for firmware – expandable through a single externally accessible SD/MMC memory card socket
Environmental Impact		RoHS compliant, 2 W power consumption, LiFePO4 batteries, designed for easy field maintenance to extend the laptop's lifespan	
Ruggedization	Water-resistant keyboard, drop-proof construction, and sturdy, easy-to-clean plastic chassis	2 mm case walls (instead of typical 1.3 mm), ports covered when closed. Dust, water resistant.	
Weight	1.25–1.49 kg	1.45–1.58 kg	1.5 kg – size: 245 mm × 230 mm × 30.5 mm (9.65" × 9" × 1.2")
Security	Hardware-based theft deterrent	Bitfrost	
Audio	Stereo 2 channel audio, built-in speakers and microphone, jack for external output and microphone input	AC97-compatible audio subsystem; internal stereo speakers and amplifier; internal monophonic microphone; jacks for external headphones and microphone; Analog Devices AD1888 and Analog Devices SSM2211 for audio amplification Microphone socket can also act as a data logger input	Audio based on the AC97 codec, with jacks for external stereo speakers and microphones, line-out, and mic-in
Camera	0.3 MP (rotated), one-click deployment and locking camera option, integrated 640 × 480 px at 30 frame/s (fps)	Integrated camera at 640 × 480 px at 30 fps	Integrated color video camera 640 × 480 px at 30 fps
Connectivity	10/100 Mbit/s Ethernet WLAN 802.11b/g/n WLAN with antenna, mesh support (Linux only), Security: WPA, WPA-PSK, WPA2, WPA2-PSK	Integrated 802.11b/g (2.4 GHz) interface; Mesh 802.11s networking supported	Wireless networking using an "Extended Range" 802.11b/g and 802.11s (mesh) Marvell 8388 wireless chip, chosen due to its ability to autonomously forward packets in the mesh even if the CPU is powered off. When connected in a mesh, it is run at a low bitrate (2 Mbit/s) to minimize power consumption. Despite the wireless chip's minimalism, it supports WPA. An ARM processor is included.

== Media appearance ==
- BBC World broadcast a program about the OLPC and the Classmate PC on 10 January 2008.
