= Sugar (desktop environment) =

Free desktop environment based on GTK+

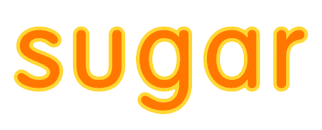

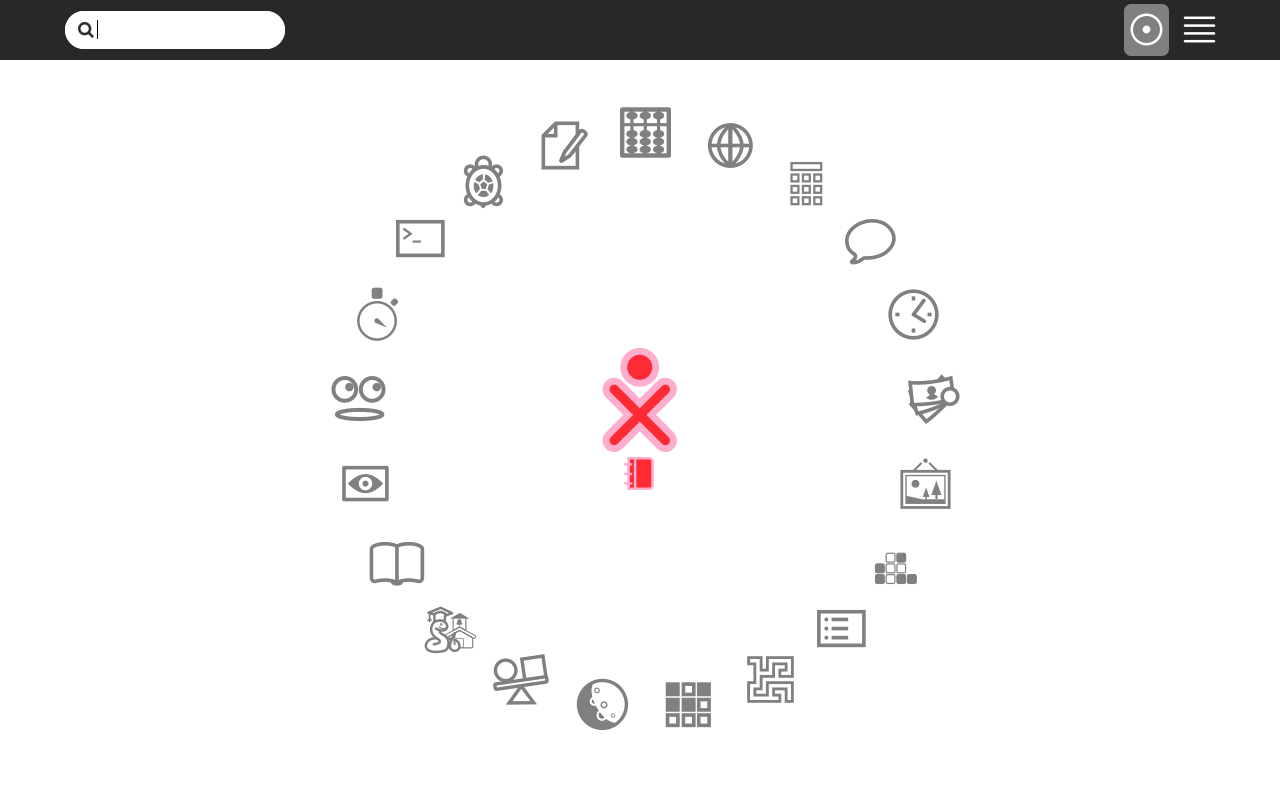
- The Sugar "Home view" (v0.121) running under Fedora 41
- Developer: Sugar Labs
- Release: May 2006; 20 years ago
- Stable release: 0.121 / 6 February 2024
- Written in: Python, PyGTK, GTK+
- Operating system: Linux
- Available in: 25 languages
- Type: Desktop environment
- License: GNU General Public License
- Website: sugarlabs.org
- Repository: github.com/sugarlabs/sugar

Sugar is a free and open-source desktop environment designed for interactive learning by children. It was developed by SugarLabs. Developed as part of the One Laptop per Child (OLPC) project, Sugar was the default interface on OLPC XO-1 laptop computers. The OLPC XO-1.5 and later provided the option of either the GNOME or Sugar interfaces.

Sugar is available as a Live CD, as Live USB, and a package installable through several Linux distributions.

Unlike most other desktop environments, Sugar does not use the "desktop", "folder" and "window" metaphors. Instead, Sugar's default full-screen activities require users to focus on only one program at a time. Sugar implements a journal which automatically saves the user's running program session and allows them to later use an interface to pull up their past works by date, an activity used, or file type.

== Design principles ==
Sugar has the objective of being suitable for even inexperienced users but provides more advanced facilities for the more experienced. The project's stated goal is to "avoid bloated interfaces", and "limit the controls to those immediately relevant to the task at hand.". Applications run full screen, double-clicking is not used, and menus show icons.

Sugar is written in Python, an interpreted language, and can be modified by users with programming experience. Desktop environments used by many operating systems are written in compiled languages such as C.

== History ==
In May 2006 Sugar's developers described it as primarily a "tool for expression," and plans were in place to include multimedia and social networking features.

Since May 2008 Sugar has been developed under the umbrella of Sugar Labs, a member project of the Software Freedom Conservancy. Some contributors are employed by One Laptop per Child and other related organizations, others are volunteers, in many cases associated with the free software community. Contributors to the original Sugar platform included Marco Pesenti Gritti, Walter Bender, Christopher Blizzard, Eben Eliason, Simon Schampijer, Christian Schmidt, Lisa Strausfeld, Takaaki Okada, Tomeu Vizoso, and Dan Williams.

=== Cross-platform ===
By early 2007 Sugar could be installed, with some difficulty, on several Linux distributions, and in virtual machines on other operating systems. By mid-2008 Sugar was available on the Debian, Ubuntu, and Fedora distributions of Linux; e.g., as of Ubuntu 8.04 (Hardy Heron), Sugar could be installed from the official Ubuntu universe repositories. By mid-2009 Sugar was also available on openSUSE and other Linux distributions. Sugar 0.82.1 was included in the OLPC system software release 8.2.0 for XO-1 laptops. Sugar 0.86 was released on September 30, 2009. Sugar 0.88 was released on March 31, 2010. Sugar 0.90.0 was released in October, 2010. There were three releases in 2011 and one in June 2012, which included support for the ARM architecture on the XO 1.75. Builds for OLPC XO laptops and the release schedule are available at OS releases. Sugar has been ported to run on Android, Firefox OS and iOS using HTML5 and JavaScript under the project name "Sugarizer"; with additional clients written for Web browsers supporting HTML5.

=== Sugar on a Stick ===
The Sugar learning platform for Linux is available as a USB-bootable Linux distribution ("Sugar on a Stick" also known as "SoaS") and as software components forming an installable additional desktop environment for most Linux distributions. It can be installed using the Fedora Live USB Creator, and can be installed onto a computer hard disk using the liveinst command from a Sugar Terminal or console.

On June 23, 2009, Sugar Labs announced the availability for download of Sugar on a Stick v1 Strawberry, which can run from a bootable 1 GB USB flash drive. On July 23, 2009, Recycle USB.com went live with a program to reflash used USB keys with the Sugar software and donate them to schools.

=== XO-1 Usage ===
The OLPC XO-1 has a 1 GB NAND flash drive and 256 MB of memory. Because the flash-based hard drive is small, swap can only be added by using an SD card or a network block device.

If too many activities are loaded at the same time there may be performance problems due to low memory or processor load.

== Sugar on Various Operating Systems ==
Sugar is available preinstalled on several Linux operating systems and among the most notable ones:

Fedora Spin SoaS

An edition of Fedora with Sugar. It is also officially featured by The Sugar Project's Wiki on its Sugar on a Stick (SoaS) web page..

Trisquel Sugar Toast

An official edition of Trisquel GNU/Linux with Sugar. It is recommended by The Sugar Project as per 2020.

== Screenshots ==
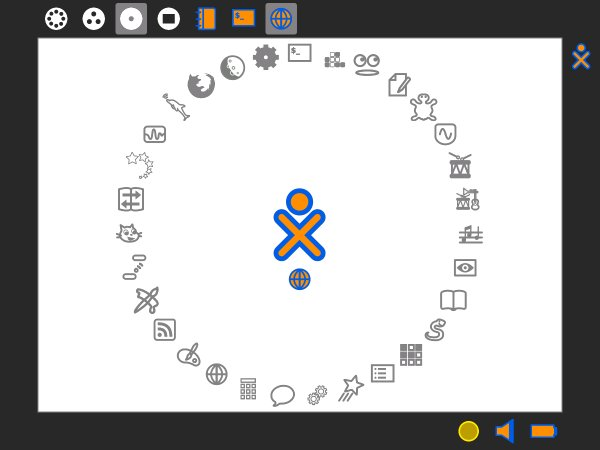
Sugar Home View

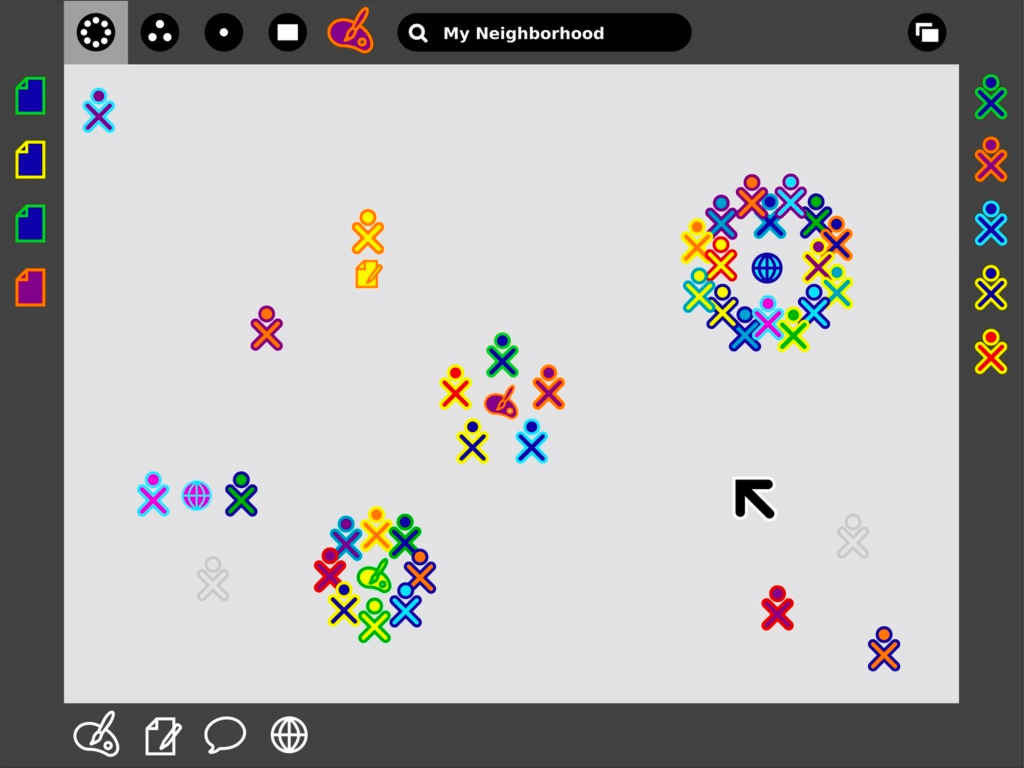
Neighborhood

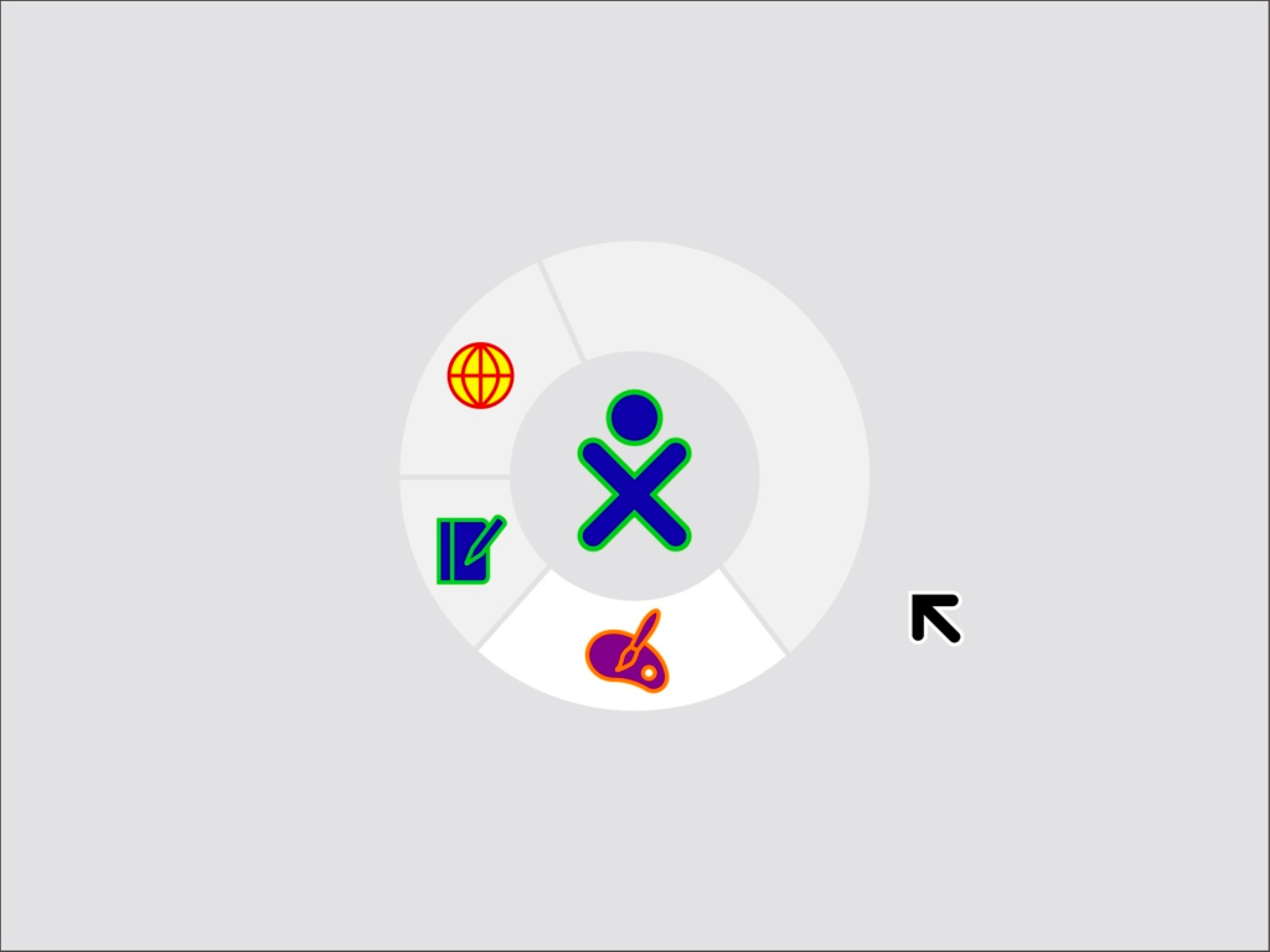
Sugar Home View from pre-0.82 releases

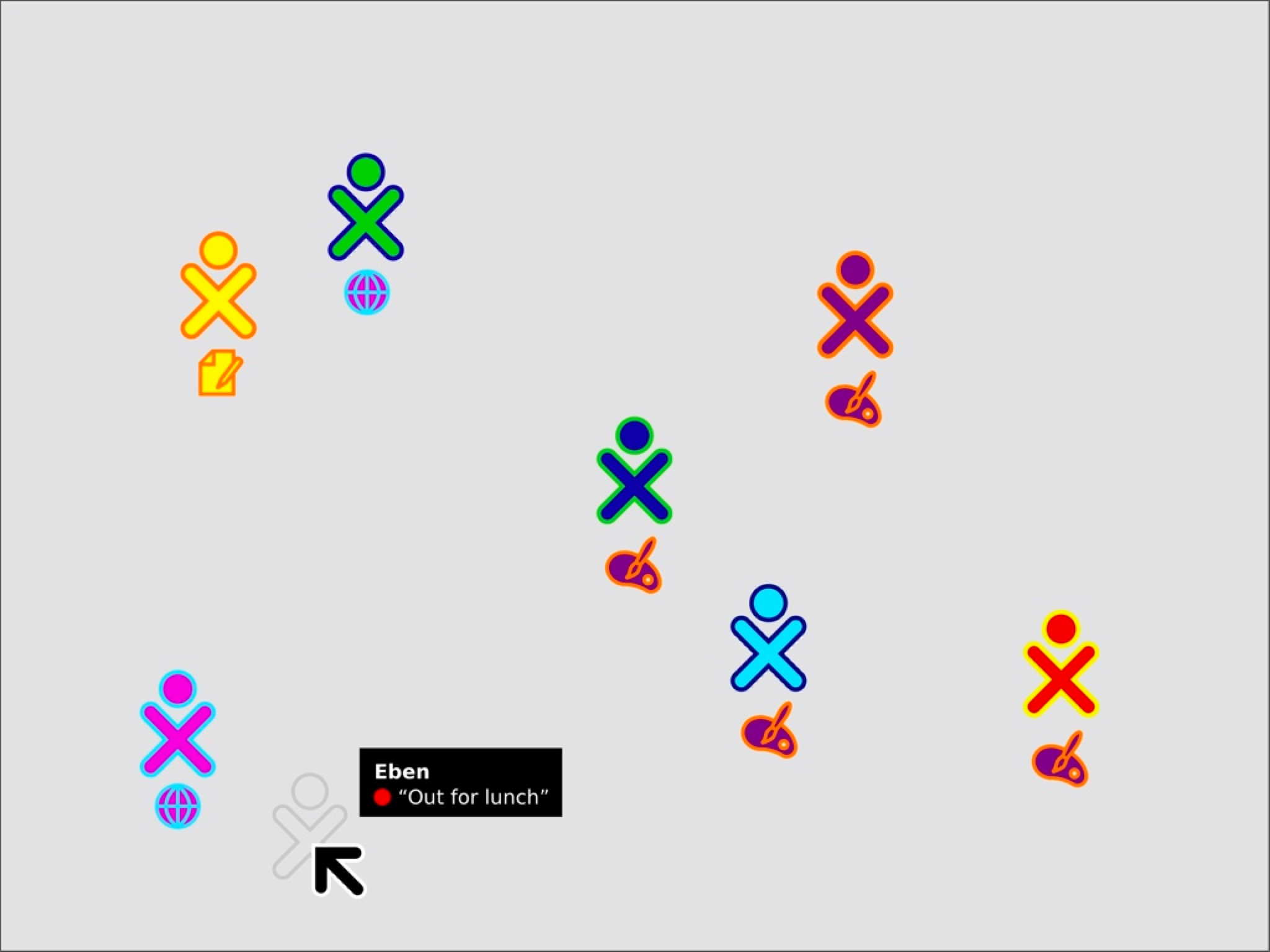
Sugar "Friends" View

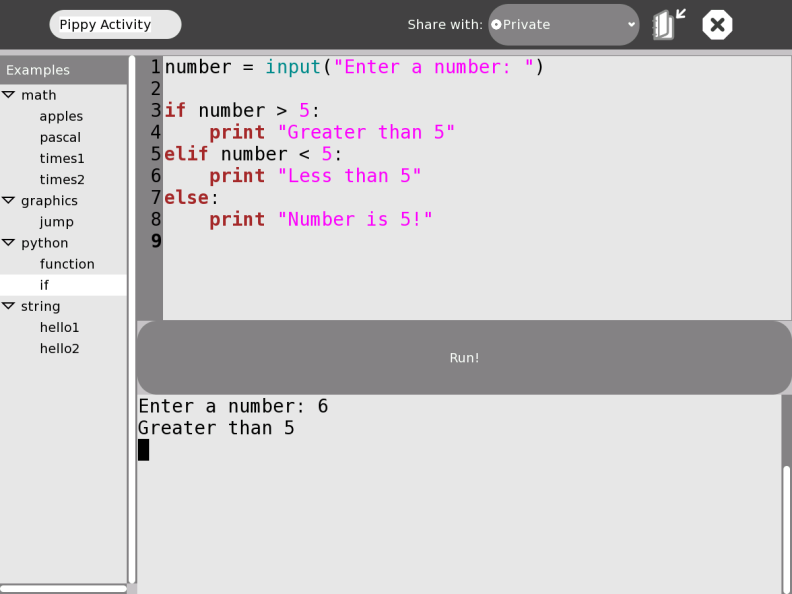
Sugar Pippy activity view.

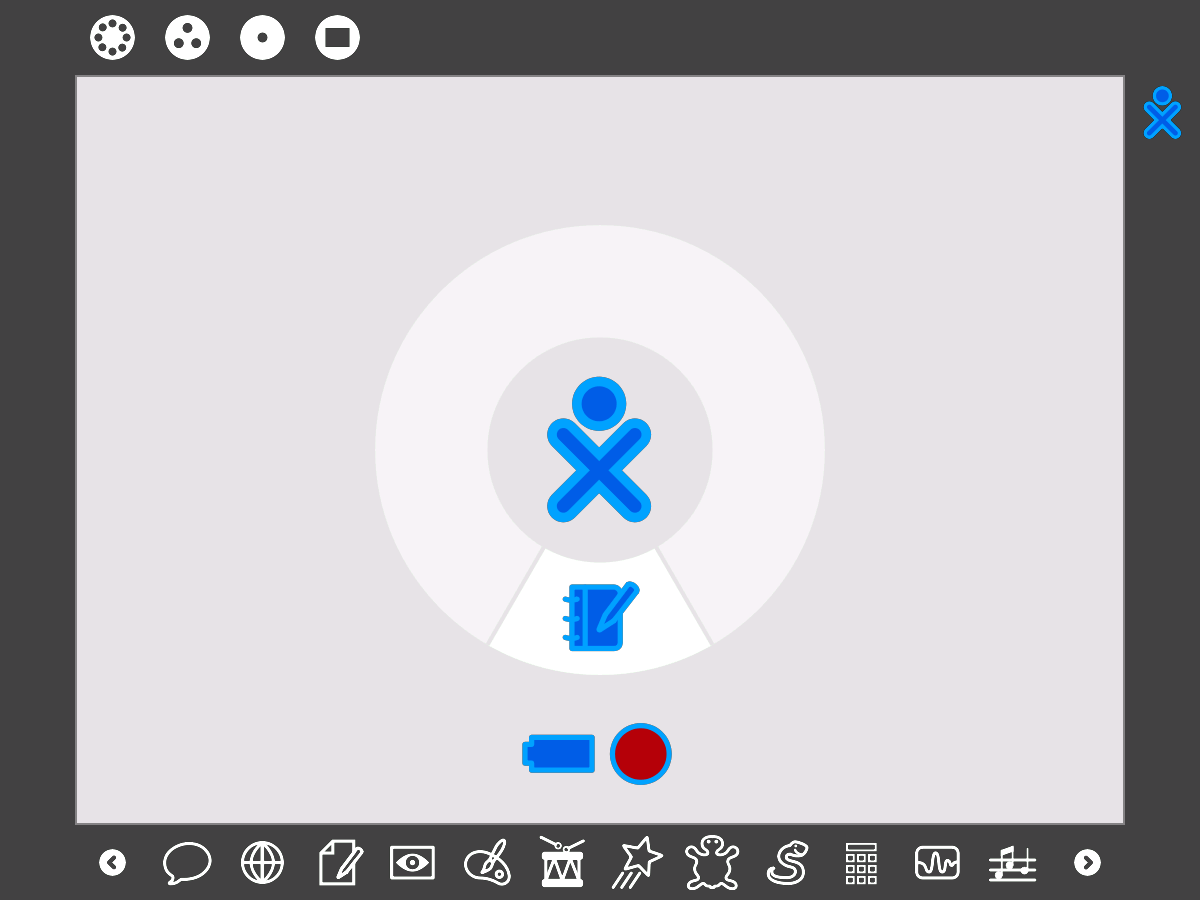
Sugar Home View with Frame from pre-0.82 releases

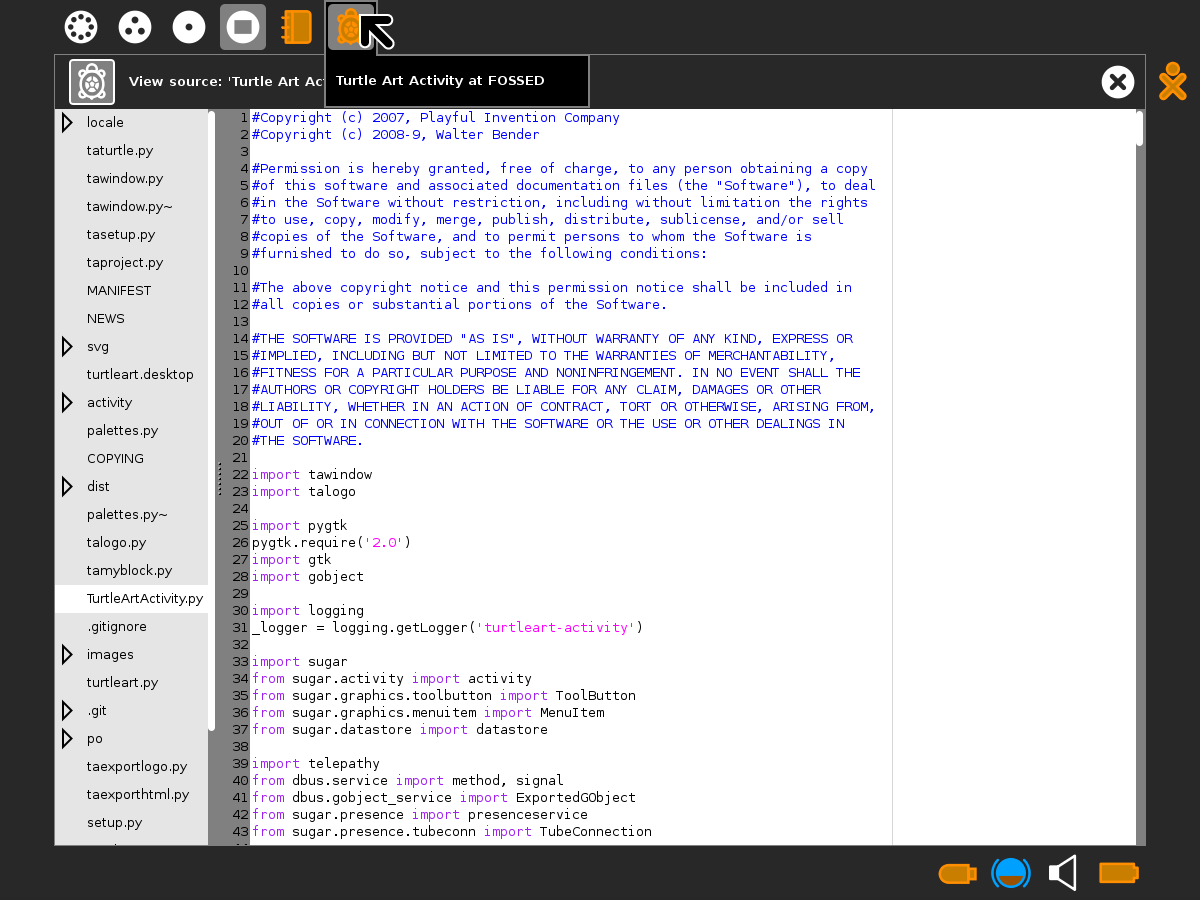
Sugar View Source

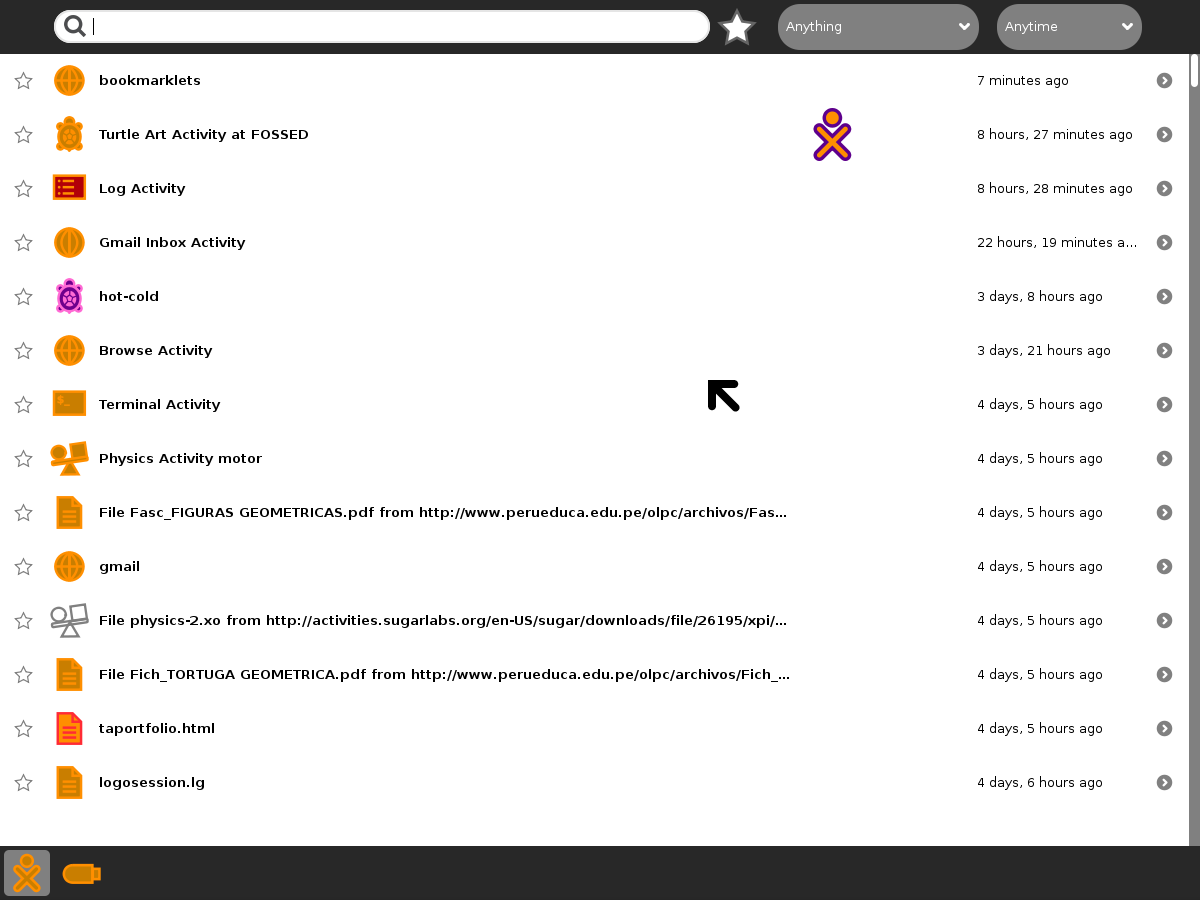
Sugar Journal

== Sugarizer ==
Sugarizer is an HTML and JavaScript based application that allows for using Sugar functionality on any device. It is available as both a web application and a mobile app. It offers a similar user interface and includes features of Sugar Core (datastore and journal), as well as many of the same Sugar activities.

== See also ==
- Educational software
- Linux
