= Digital media use and mental health =

Mental health effects of using digital media

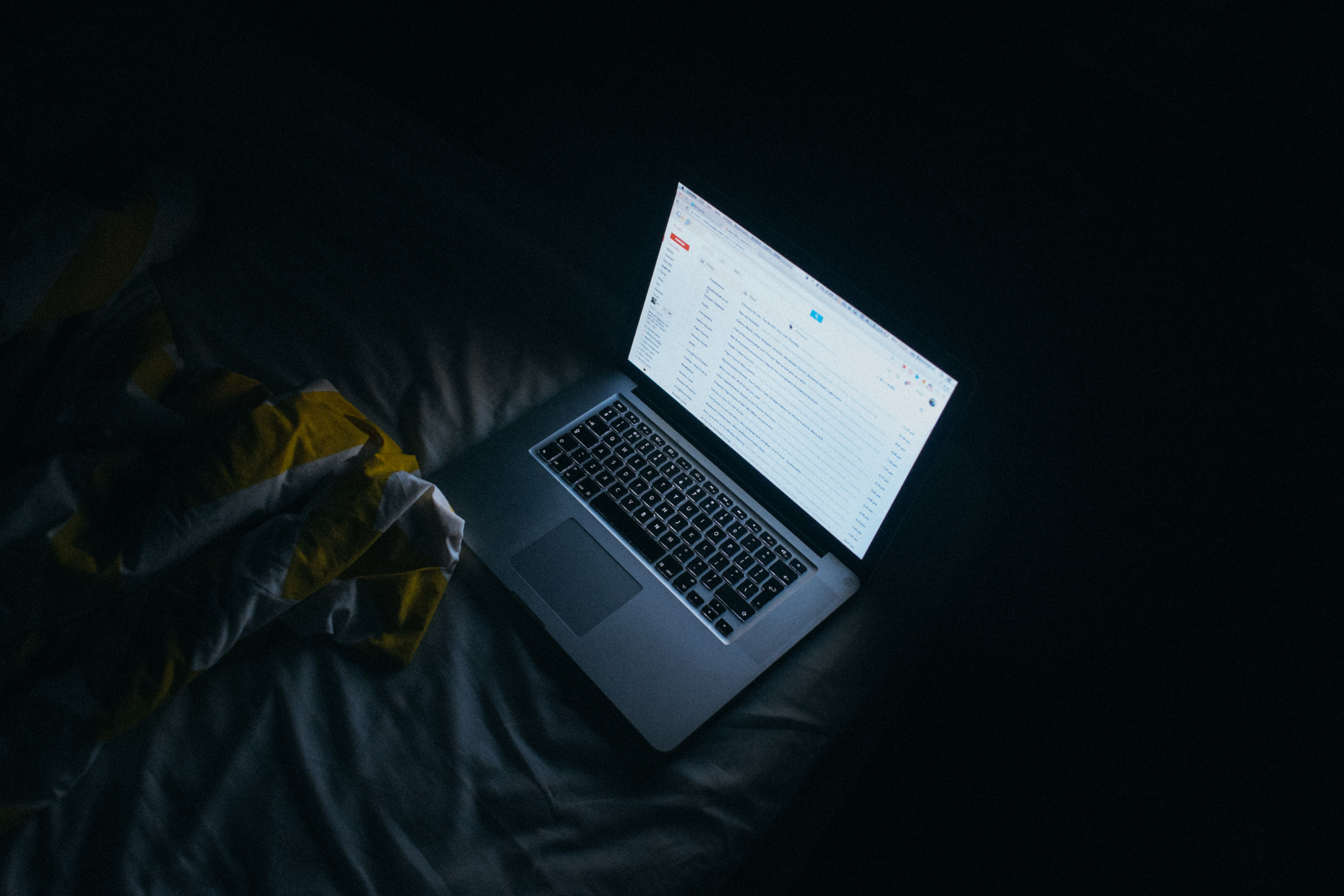
"Fear of missing out" can lead to psychological stress at the idea of missing posted content by others while offline.

Researchers in psychology, sociology, anthropology, and medicine have studied the relationship between digital media use and mental health since the mid-1990s, following the rise of the internet and mobile communication technologies. There has been a lot of research that has examined patterns of excessive or problematic use, sometimes described as "digital dependencies," which can vary across cultures and societies. At the same time, some studies have highlighted potential benefits of moderate digital media use, including supporting mental health or facilitating access to online support communities. Overall, the effect of digital media on mental health are complex and vary depending on individual, cultural, and platform-specific factors.

The distinction between beneficial and excessive digital media use has not yet been clearly established. Few widely accepted diagnostic criteria exist for problematic or pathological use, although some experts have suggested that overuse may be related to underlying psychiatric disorders. Recommendations for safer media use for children and families have been proposed, but prevention and treatment strategies are not standardized. Research also highlights ongoing debate regarding the classification of problematic digital media behaviours and the appropriateness of terms such as "addiction."

Digital media use, including time spent on social media platforms such as Instagram, TikTok, Snapchat, as well as Facebook, has been associated with both positive and negative effects on the cognitive, social and emotional development of children and adolescents. Evidence suggests that the relationship between digital media use and mental health outcomes is complex and may vary depending on the individual, the type of platform used, and patterns of engagement.

A 2017 study by He, Turel, and Bechara reported that excessive social media use was associated with reduced gray matter volume in brain regions involved in attention and impulse control, suggesting potential structural changes related to long-term overstimulation.

== History and Terminology ==
The relationship between digital technology and mental health has been studied from multiple perspectives. Research has identified benefits of digital media use for childhood and adolescent development. However, researchers, clinicians, and the public have also expressed concern over compulsive behaviours linked to digital media use, as increasing evidence shows correlations between excessive technology use and mental health issues.

Terminologies used to refer to compulsive digital-media-use behaviours are not standardized or universally recognised. They include "digital addiction", "digital dependence", "problematic use", or "overuse", often delineated by the digital media platform used or under study (such as problematic smartphone use or problematic internet use). Unrestrained use of technological devices may affect developmental, social, mental and physical well-being and may result in symptoms akin to other psychological dependence syndromes, or behavioral addictions. The focus on problematic technology use in research, particularly in relation to the behavioural addiction paradigm, is becoming more accepted, despite poor standardization and conflicting research.

Internet addiction has been proposed as a diagnosis since 1998 and social media and its relation to addiction has been examined since 2009. A 2018 Organisation for Economic Co-operation and Development (OECD) report stated there were benefits of structured and limited internet use in children and adolescents for developmental and educational purposes, but that excessive use can have a negative impact on mental well-being. The report also noted a 40% overall increase in internet use among school-age children between 2010 and 2015, with significant variations in usage rates and platform preferences across different OECD countries. The American Psychological Association recommends that adolescents receive training or coaching on social media use to help them develop psychologically informed skills and competencies, promoting balanced, safe, and meaningful engagement online.

The Diagnostic and Statistical Manual of Mental Disorders (DSM) has not formally classified problematic digital media use as a diagnostic category but identified internet gaming disorder as a condition warranting further study in 2013. Meanwhile, gaming disorder—commonly known as video game addiction—is recognized in the ICD-11. The differing recommendations between the DSM and ICD partly reflect a lack of expert consensus, variations in the focus of each classification system, and challenges in applying animal models to behavioural addictions.

The utility of the term addiction in relation to the overuse of digital media has been questioned, in regard to its suitability to describe new, digitally mediated psychiatric categories, as opposed to overuse being a manifestation of other psychiatric disorders. Usage of the term has also been criticised for drawing parallels with substance use behaviours. Careless use of the term may cause more problems—both downplaying the risks of harm in seriously affected people, as well as overstating risks of excessive, non-pathological use of digital media. The evolution of terminology relating excessive digital media use to problematic use rather than addiction was encouraged by Panova and Carbonell, psychologists at Ramon Llull University, in a 2018 review.

Due to the lack of recognition and consensus on the concepts used, diagnoses and treatments are difficult to standardize or develop. Heightened levels of public anxiety around new media (including social media, smartphones and video games) adds confusion to the interpretation of population-based assessments, as well as posing management dilemmas. Radesky and Christakis, the 2019 editors of JAMA Paediatrics, published a review that investigated "concerns about health and developmental/behavioural risks of excessive media use for child cognitive, language, literacy, and social-emotional development." Due to the ready availability of multiple technologies to children worldwide, the problem is bi-directional, as taking away digital devices may have a detrimental effect, in areas such as learning, family relationship dynamics, and overall development.

== Problematic Use ==
Associations have been observed between excessive digital media use and mental health symptoms, including anxiety, depression, and attention difficulties, but causality has not been established. Problematic use has also been associated with fear of missing out (FoMO), where users experience anxiety or stress about potentially missing online content, which may contribute to feelings of social exclusion. Younger users may be particularly vulnerable to social comparison, which can exacerbate anxiety or depressive symptoms. Although some neuroscientific research has explored structural brain differences associated with excessive digital media use, there is currently no established biological mechanism that explains why some individuals develop problematic use patterns.

=== Screen Time and Mental Health ===
Certain types of problematic internet use have been linked to psychiatric and behavioural issues such as depression, anxiety, hostility, aggression, and attention deficit hyperactivity disorder (ADHD). However, studies have not established clear causal relationships—for instance, it remains unclear whether individuals with depression overuse the internet because of their condition, or if excessive internet use contributes to developing depression. Research also suggests that social media's effects can be both positive and negative, depending on individual circumstances. While digital media overuse has been associated with depressive symptoms, it may also be used in some cases to improve mood. A large prospective study found a positive correlation between ADHD symptoms and digital media use.

Research suggests that the relationship between digital media use and mental health may depend on how people use digital media, rather than only on the amount of time they spend online. A systematic review of longitudinal studies found that higher screen time was associated with negative mental health outcome among young people, but the strength of these relationships varies across studies. Other research has found that social media use can provide opportunities for social connection and support while also being associated with symptoms of anxiety and depression. These findings suggest that the type of digital media use, the user's individual circumstances, and the way the technology is used may be important when examining its effects on mental health.

Although the ADHD symptom of hyperfocus may lead some individuals to spend excessive time on video games, social media, or online chatting, the link between hyperfocus and problematic social media use is relatively weak. A 2018 review found associations between the self-reported mental health symptoms by users of the Chinese social media platform WeChat and excessive platform use. However, the motivations and usage patterns of WeChat users affected overall psychological health, rather than the amount of time spent using the platform. During the COVID-19 pandemic specifically, a meta-analysis reported that although gaming time increased modestly, greater time spent gaming was not linked to differences in well-being across studies.

The evidence, although of mainly low to moderate quality, shows a correlation between heavy screen time and a variety of physical and mental health problems. Social media is found to be one of the main factors of procrastination, especially for students. Although media provides entertainment it can also be a distraction leading to these declines in academic success. Research from stop Procrastinating finds social media and other forms of media, to be the leading cause of procrastination trends. However, moderate use of digital media has been linked to positive outcomes, including improved social integration, mental health, and overall well-being for young people. In fact, certain digital platforms, when used in moderation, have even been associated with enhanced mental health.

In a 2022 review, it was discovered that when it comes to adolescents' well-being that perhaps there is too much focus on locating a negative correlation between digital technologies and adolescents' well-being, If a negative correlation between the two are located the impact would potentially be minimal to the point where it would have little to no impact on adolescent well-being or quality of life.

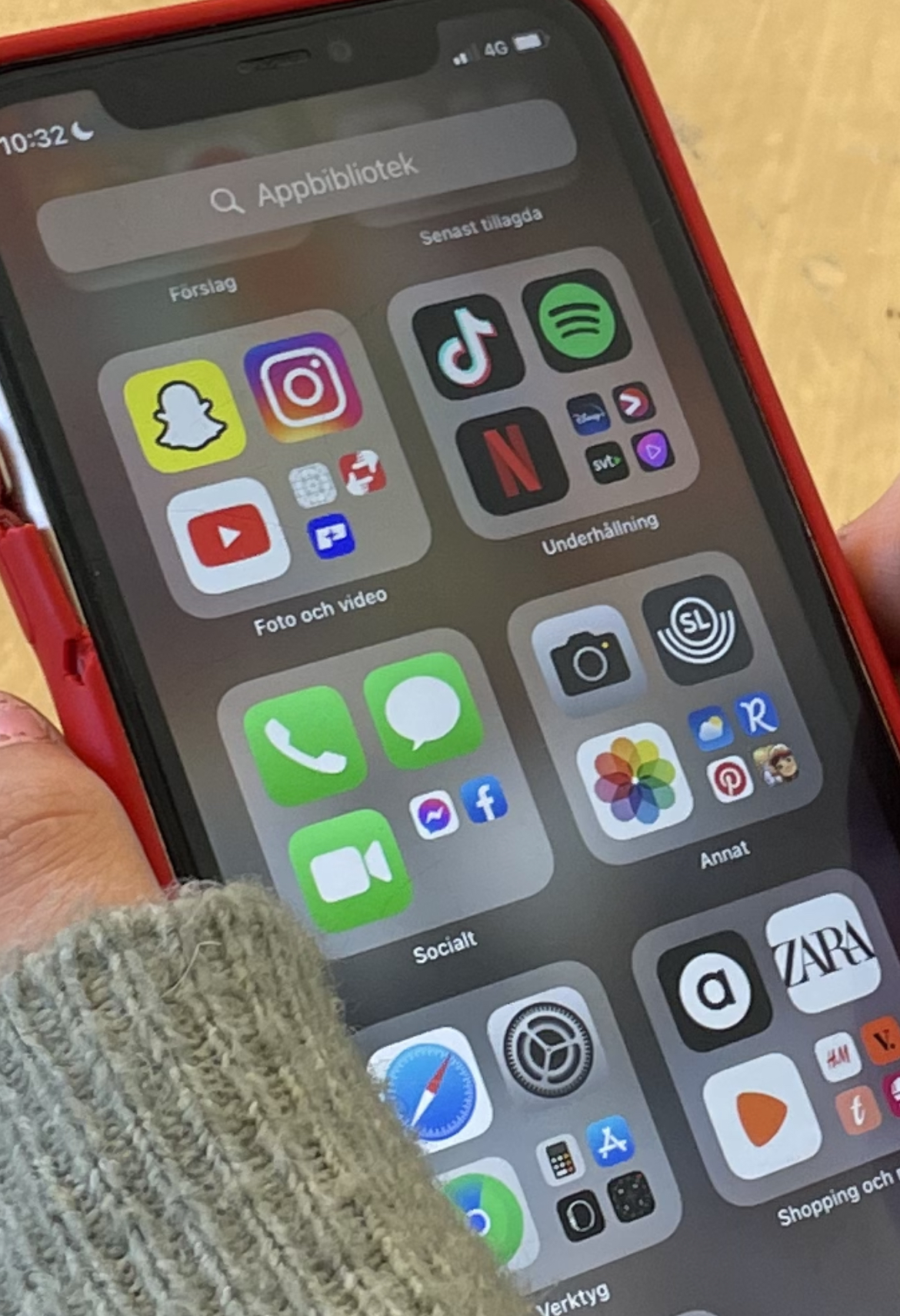
Social media applications in which users can easily access social feeds, be notified of new content, and connect with others in real time

=== Social Media and Mental Health ===
Excessive social media use has been associated with negative mental health outcomes among adolescents and young adults. Some studies have found associations between social media use and mental health difficulties, though results are often weak or inconsistent across studies. Social media use may have both positive and negative effects, depending on factors such as the type of use, frequency, and individual context. Among older adults, evidence suggests that social media use may be associated with positive outcomes, such as enhanced social connection and well-being, although causality has not been established.

Social media can be a valuable tool that, when used appropriately, brings positive benefits both online and offline. For adolescents, social media offers opportunities to build and maintain relationships, access information, connect with others in real time, and express themselves through creating and engaging with content. However, improper use of social media can pose risks. Adolescents may be exposed to cyberbullying, sexual predators, inappropriate adult content, substance use, and unrealistic portrayals of people and lifestyles.

Digital technologies tend to focus on hedonic well-being, in which users are exposed to content that evokes joy and laughter towards positive content, or anger and sadness towards negative content. In turn these negative impacts on adolescence or any users of social media will only experience temporary impacts on mental well-being, which will not have a permanent effect on the user's quality of life and life satisfaction.

When asked about the amount of time spent on social media teenagers reported that 55 percent have the right amount of time spent on social media. 35 percent of teenagers reported they spent too much time on social media, while 8 percent stated they spent too little time on social media.

=== Generative AI and Mental Health ===
Based on a nationally representative sample of 20,847 US adults, a 2026 survey study in JAMA Network Open found that daily generative AI use was significantly associated with greater depressive symptoms, with the odds of at least moderate depression roughly 30% higher among daily users than among non-users. The association was strongest for personal use and among those aged 25 to 64; the cross-sectional design did not allow for causal conclusions. Separately, a 2025 nationally representative survey of US adolescents and young adults (aged 12 to 21) found that roughly 13% had used generative AI for emotional support, with more than 90% of them reporting the advice as helpful.

Controlled trials have shown some therapeutic potential. The first randomized controlled trial of a fully generative AI therapy chatbot, published in NEJM AI in 2025, found significant reductions in symptoms of depression, anxiety, and eating disorders over four weeks compared to a waitlist control, with participants rating the therapeutic alliance as comparable to that of human therapists. These findings are consistent with a 2025 meta-analysis of 31 RCTs (n=29,637) that found small-to-moderate effects of AI chatbots in reducing depressive, anxiety, and stress symptoms among young adults. Commercially available therapy chatbots nevertheless show significant shortcomings: a 2025 Stanford University study found that they exhibited stigmatizing attitudes toward conditions such as schizophrenia and alcohol dependence, and responded inappropriately to suicidal ideation and delusional thinking.

Researchers have also raised concerns about AI companion chatbots and emotional dependency. While some users of companion apps report reduced loneliness, scientists worry about long-term dependency when chatbots provide constant validation without challenging users' assumptions. In 2026, Stanford researchers found that users of the Character.AI platform with limited offline social networks reported feeling more lonely after seeking emotional support from chatbots.

Overreliance on generative AI may also affect cognitive skills. In a study presented at the 2026 Conference on Human Factors in Computing Systems, participants who used AI regularly over four weeks showed a decreased ability to discern misinformation on their own.

AI also raises concerned with credibility as it is so increasingly growing. AI can be enabling to users to manipulate and even distort information to seem plausible, but is fabricated. This information reshapes the way viewers consider fairness, values, bias, and authenticity. It's important to consider the information quickly being given and question it's credibility to the topic.

=== Self-Esteem and Body Image Issues ===
To further investigate, arguably for young adolescents, the most crucial negative aspect to shed to light is self-esteem and body image. Exposure to various platforms such as Instagram, Snapchat, and now Tik Tok, many influencers post appearance based content. This content includes triggering subjects such as "What I eat in a day," or social comparison. Apps that are more photo based rather than text based relate consistently more to dysfunctional body image. These relationships appear to be largely similar across genders Research emphasizes how this type of content is extremely controversial and dangerous, especially to a younger audience.

From research about body image and self security theories, different people exposed tend to be fit for these unrealistic beauty standards. In today's world, there is a certain mold to become one's 'best' self, which can look appealing to one, expecting to appear the same way. Commonly, if they don't feel like meeting these body standards, they will feel a sense of negativity. These standards have engulfed our society and tend to lead to unsafe outcomes.

=== Demographics ===
Research indicates that excessive digital media use may be associated with negative mental health outcomes, particularly among adolescents and young adults. Studies have reported associations between higher digital media use and increased symptoms of anxiety, depression, and lower life satisfaction, although findings vary across populations and study designs. Conversely, some evidence suggests that moderate or purposeful digital media use may provide social support, opportunities for connection, and other positive outcomes for adolescents, depending on individual and contextual factors.

The majority of adolescents report using some form of social media, with daily use being common. Social media use among youth can have both potential benefits, such as supporting social connection, and potential risks for mental health. Higher levels of digital media use have been associated with an increased risk of anxiety, depression, and other mental health difficulties in adolescents, although causality has not been established.

Social media plays a major role in how teenagers communicate and spend their time, but it has also raised growing concerns about mental health. Studies suggest that heavy use of social networking platforms can be linked to increased feelings of anxiety, depression, and emotional stress among adolescents. Because of these risks, many health professionals and educators are encouraging young people to develop healthier habits and be more mindful of how much time they spend online (Stanford Law School, 2024).

Further research has suggested social media encourages anxiety to increase in adolescents. In addition, this can affect the youth's sleep, which can cause further issues with anxiety. Especially through comparing themselves to other people, cyberbullying, and being drawn to long hours on the internet. Looking at the issue through a public health lens, this behavior shows risk factors that can influence negative social behavior across large groups of youth. Too much exposure to features, which include likes and comments, reinforce validation-seeking behaviors and contribute to stress.

== Proposed Diagnostic Categories ==
Gaming disorder has been considered by the DSM-5 task force as warranting further study (as the subset internet gaming disorder), and was included in the ICD-11. Concerns have been raised by Aarseth and colleagues over this inclusion, particularly in regard to stigmatization of heavy gamers.

Christakis has asserted that internet addiction may be "a 21st century epidemic". In 2018, he commented that childhood Internet overuse may be a form of "uncontrolled experiment[s] on ... children". International estimates of the prevalence of internet overuse have varied considerably, with marked variations by nation. A 2014 meta-analysis of 31 nations yielded an overall worldwide prevalence of six percent. A different perspective in 2018 by Musetti and colleagues reappraised the internet in terms of its necessity and ubiquity in modern society, as a social environment, rather than a tool, thereby calling for the reformulation of the internet addiction model.

Some medical and behavioural scientists recommend adding a diagnosis of "social media addiction" (or similar) to the next Diagnostic and Statistical Manual of Mental Disorders update. A 2015 review concluded there was a probable link between basic psychological needs and social media addiction, stating, "Social network site users seek feedback, and they get it from hundreds of people—instantly. It could be argued that the platforms are designed to get users 'hooked'."

Internet sex addiction, also called cybersex addiction, is proposed as a sexual addiction involving virtual sexual activities online that can lead to significant negative effects on a person's physical, mental, social, or financial well-being. It is often regarded as a form of problematic internet use.

=== ADHD ===
Meta-analysis and systematic reviews of studies have shown a link between internet use, gaming disorders, social media use, and ADHD or symptoms of ADHD including impulsive traits; however, associations and causality are not clear. There is some evidence of a bi-directional relationship in which people with ADHD may be more likely to engage with problematic internet or gaming use, and higher digital media use may worsen existing ADHD symptoms. An important group to talk about regarding the relationship between ADHD and digital media is adolescents, a meta-analysis has shown that it is more common for adolescents to have problematic gaming if they also have ADHD, it also showed results indicating that ADHD may predict future problematic gaming as well.

=== Anxiety ===
There is evidence of weak to moderate associations between gaming disorder or smartphone use and social anxiety and depressive symptoms, and nomophobia. However these are also not causal, the nature of the associations is not clear. There is also some evidence of bi-directionality. There are some conflicting results from systematic reviews. There are also some links between the amount of personal information uploaded, and social media addictive behaviors all correlated with anxiety.

=== Autism ===
In August 2015, NeuroTribes identified autistic digital communities such as Autism Network International, Wrong Planet, and the Autism List mailing list at St. John's University (New York City). Steve Silberman argued that these communities "provided a natural home" where autistic members "could interact at their own pace." Jim Sinclair was a member of Autism List and participated in founding Autism Network International.

A 2018 systematic review of 47 studies published from 2005 to 2016 concluded that associations between autism and screen time was inconclusive. Another 2019 systematic review of 16 studies that found that autistic children and adolescents are exposed to more screen time than typically developing peers and that the exposure starts at a younger age. A 2021 systematic review of 12 studies of video game addiction in autistic subjects found that children, adolescents, and autistic adults are at greater risk of video game addiction than non-autistic adults, and that the data from the studies suggested that internal and external factors (sex, attention and oppositional behavior problems, social aspects, access and time spent playing video games, parental rules, and game genre) were significant predictors of video game addiction in autistic subjects. A 2022 systematic review of 21 studies investigating associations between autism, problematic internet use, and gaming disorder found that the majority of studies found positive associations between the disorders.

Another 2022 systematic review of 10 studies found that autistic subjects had more symptoms of problematic internet use than control group subjects, had higher screen time online and an earlier age of first-time use of the internet, and also greater symptoms of depression and ADHD. A 2023 meta-analysis of 46 studies comprising 562,131 subjects that concluded that while screen time may be a developmental cause of autism in childhood, associations between autism and screen time were not statistically significant when accounting for publication bias.

=== Bipolar Disorder ===
There is some evidence of an association between problematic internet use as a risk factor for bipolar disorder.

Social media can have relation to Bipolar disorder. Students in Malaysia found associations between Facebook and YouTube use and measure related to bipolar disorder. Studies suggest that the relationship between social media use and mental health may vary on different platforms.

=== Depression ===
There is a growing body of evidence demonstrating an association between screen-based behaviours and depressive symptoms or clinical depression. Studies across a wide range of populations including different ages, genders, and cultures report small to moderate associations between these behaviors and depression symptoms, with problematic use more strongly associated with depression than general use. While some studies suggest these associations may be bidirectional or influenced by factors like social support or content type, the overall direction of findings points to screen-based behaviours as a potential risk factor for a person to experience depressive symptoms. The strength and nature of these associations has been reported to vary and may depend on usage and patterns, individual vulnerabilities, and geographic context. Causality remains unclear.

=== Sleep ===
Sleep quality and screen time or digital media use have been linked, including studies looking at media type, time of day, and age of person. Various sleep challenges or outcomes have been studied including a reduction in sleep duration, increased sleep onset latency, modifications to rapid eye movement sleep and slow-wave sleep, increased sleepiness and self-perceived fatigue, and impaired post-sleep attention span and verbal memory.

=== Narcissism ===
There are some reports of positive correlations between grandiose narcissism and social networking site usage, highlighting the potential for a correlation between time spent on social media, frequency of status updates, number of friends or followers, and frequency of posting self-portrait digital photographs.

=== Obsessive–Compulsive Disorder ===
There is some evidence suggesting a significant correlation between digital media overuse and obsessive–compulsive disorder symptoms.

A study found that OCD symptoms tend to have greater importance on social media and reported stronger effects on their mood compared to those with lower levels of symptoms. The study suggest that social media experiences may vary depending on the severity of OCD symptoms.

=== Related Phenomena ===
==== Online problem gambling ====
A 2015 review found evidence of higher rates of mental health comorbidities, as well as higher amounts of substance use, among internet gamblers, compared to non-internet gamblers. Causation, however, has not been established. The review postulates that there may be differences in the cohorts between internet and land-based problem gamblers.

==== Cyberbullying ====
Cyberbullying, bullying or harassment using social media or other electronic means, has been shown to have effects on mental health. Victims may have lower self-esteem, increased suicidal ideation, decreased motivation for usual hobbies, and a variety of emotional responses, including being scared, frustrated, angry, anxious or depressed. These victims may also begin to distance themselves from friends and family members.

According to the EU Kids Online project, the incidence of cyberbullying across seven European countries in children aged 8–16 increased from 8% to 12% between 2010 and 2014. Similar increases were shown in the United States and Brazil.

==== Media Multitasking ====
Concurrent use of multiple digital media streams, commonly known as media multitasking, has been shown to be associated with depressive symptoms, social anxiety, impulsivity, sensation seeking, lower perceived social success and neuroticism. A 2018 review found that while the literature is sparse and inconclusive, overall, heavy media multitaskers also have poorer performance in several cognitive domains, including working memory, attention span, relational reasoning, inference management, and long-term memory. Oppositely, high media multitasking is correlated with both a better and worse ability to manage task goals such as switching between multiple tasks at once. One of the authors commented that the data does not "unambiguously show that media multitasking causes a change in attention and memory", therefore it is possible to argue that it is inefficient to multitask on digital media.

==== Distracted road use ====
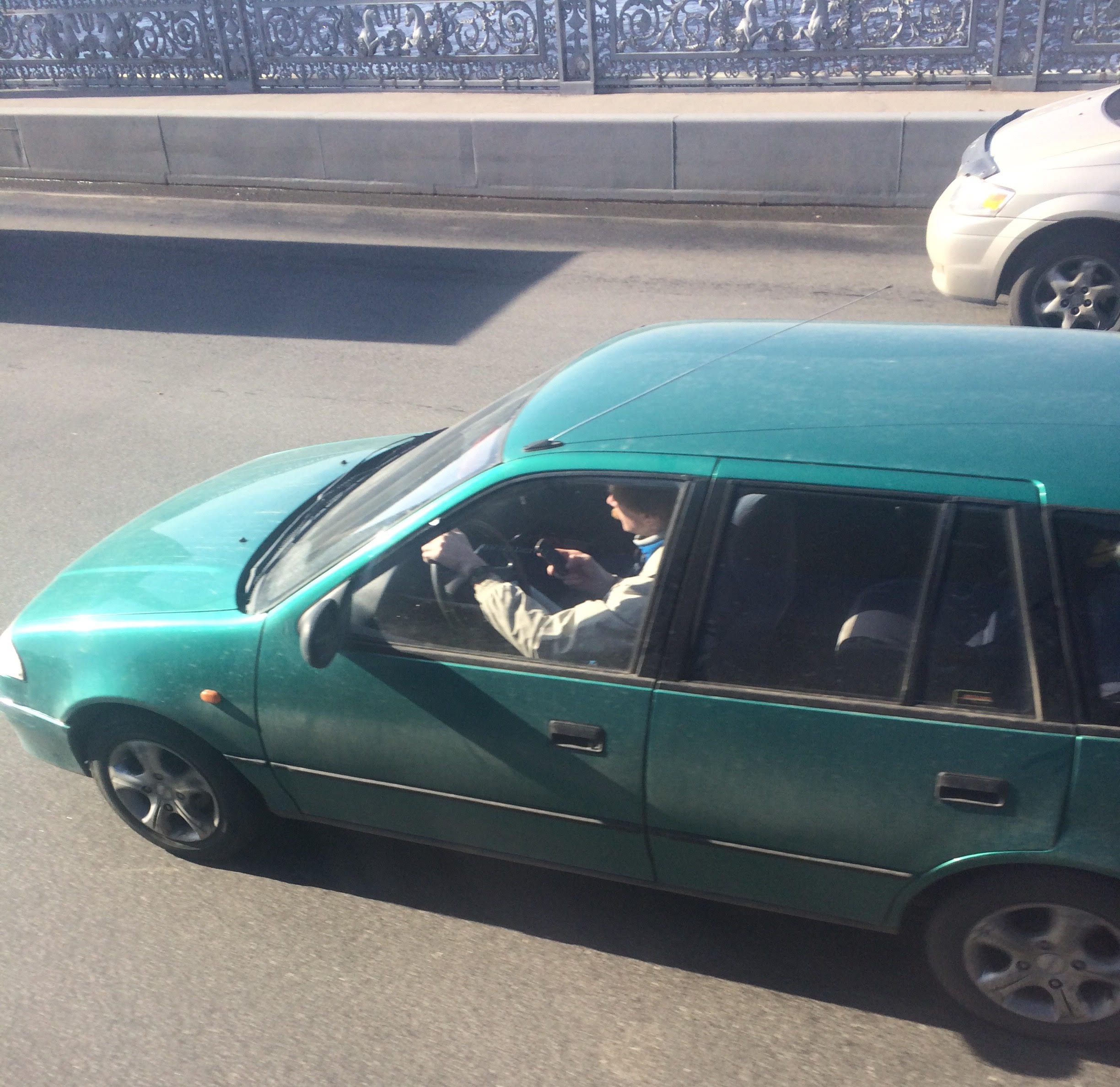
A driver using a mobile phone

An association between problematic mobile phone use and a greater risk of simultaneous mobile phone use and road use and risk of vehicle collisions and pedestrian collisions or falls has been found.

==== Noise-induced hearing loss ====
A 2024 systematic review of 14 studies investigating associations between sound-induced hearing loss and playing video games and esports found that there was a significant association between gaming and hearing loss or tinnitus, and that the average measured sound levels during gameplay by subjects (which averaged 3 hours per week) exceeded or nearly exceeded permissible sound exposure levels.

Physical Effects

Extended periods of screen use have been linked to poor posture, eye strain, and reduced physical activity, which may contribute to more serious health issues such as obesity, musculoskeletal pain, and even cardiovascular problems. Sedentary behavior, especially when combined with poor diet habits during screen time, increases the risk of long-term health complications. Also, blue light exposure from screens can disrupt sleep patterns, reducing sleep quality and affecting overall physical recovery.

=== Assessment and treatment ===
Rigorous, evidence-based assessment of problematic digital media use is yet to be comprehensively established. This is due partially to a lack of consensus around the various constructs and lack of standardization of treatments. The American Academy of Pediatrics (AAP) has developed a Family Media Plan, intending to help parents assess and structure their family's use of electronic devices and media more safely. It recommends limiting entertainment screen time to two hours or less per day. The Canadian Paediatric Society produced a similar guideline. Ferguson, a psychologist, has criticised these and other national guidelines for not being evidence-based. Other experts, cited in a 2017 UNICEF Office of Research literature review, have recommended addressing potential underlying problems rather than arbitrarily enforcing screen time limits.

Different methodologies for assessing pathological internet use have been developed, mostly self-report questionnaires, but none have been universally recognised as a gold standard. For gaming disorder, both the American Psychiatric Association and the World Health Organization (through the ICD-11) have released diagnostic criteria.

There is limited evidence supporting the effectiveness of cognitive behavioral therapy and family-based interventions for treating problematic digital media use. Randomized controlled trials have not demonstrated the efficacy of medications for this purpose. A 2016 study involving 901 adolescents suggested that mindfulness techniques may help prevent and treat problematic internet use. A 2019 UK parliamentary report emphasized the importance of parental engagement, awareness, and support in fostering "digital resilience" among young people and in managing online risks. Treatment centers addressing digital dependence have grown in number, particularly in countries like China and South Korea, which have declared it a public health crisis and opened approximately 300 and 190 centers nationwide, respectively. Several other countries have also established similar treatment facilities.

NGOs, support and advocacy groups provide resources to people overusing digital media, with or without codified diagnoses, including the American Academy of Child and Adolescent Psychiatry.

A 2022 study outlines the mechanisms by which media-transmitted stressors affect mental well-being. Authors suggest a common denominator related to problems with the media's construction of reality is increased uncertainty, which leads to defensive responses and chronic stress in predisposed individuals.

== Mental Health Benefits ==
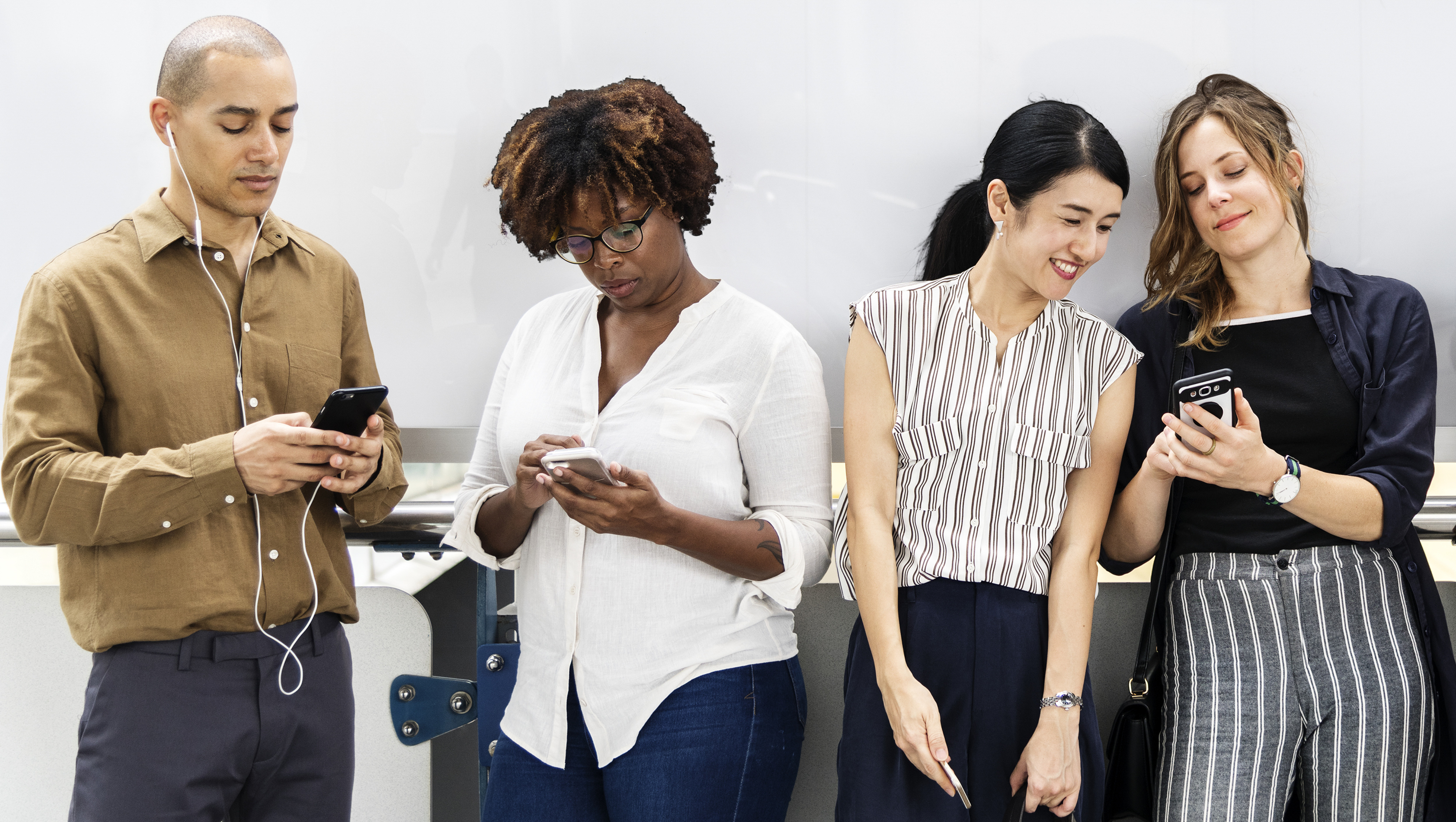
Smartphones and other digital devices are ubiquitous in many societies.

There is some evidence that people with mental illness can have a positive outcomes based on digital media use, such as the potential to develop social connections over social media and foster a sense of social inclusion in online communities. Digital communities or social media may also have the potential for some people with mental illness to share personal stories in a perceived safer space, as well as gaining peer support for developing coping strategies. There are some reports of people avoiding stigma and gaining further insight into their mental health condition, including the potential for dialogue with healthcare professionals, as benefits of using social media. This comes with the usual digital media risk of the potential for unhealthy influences, misinformation, and delayed access to traditional mental health outlets.

Other benefits include the potential to gain connections to supportive online communities, including illness or disability specific communities, as well as the LGBTQIA community. Young people with cancer have reported an improvement in their coping abilities due to their participation in an online community.

Furthermore, in children, there may be educational benefits of digital media use. For example, screen-based programs may help increase both independent and collaborative learning. A variety of quality apps and software may decrease learning gaps and increase skill in certain educational subjects. The benefits (and risks) may also be specific to cultures and geographic locations.

Young people may have different experiences online, depending on their socio-economic background, noting lower-income youths may spend up to three hours more per day using digital devices, compared to higher-income youths. Lower-income youths, who are already vulnerable to mental illness, may be more passive in their online engagements, being more susceptible to negative feedback online, with difficulty self-regulating their digital media use. It has been suggested that this may be a new form of digital divide between at-risk young people and other young people, pre-existing risks of mental illness becoming amplified among the already vulnerable population.

Social media use has been associated with both positive and negative effects on young adults mental health. Research has found that problematic and passive social media use are more associated with negative mental health outcomes. However, some studies have also found benefits, that include higher social support and reduced feelings of loneliness. Young adults also have positive associations between online social networks and mood, life satisfaction, and experiences of loneliness through seeking support and receiving positive feedback.

== Impact On Cognition ==
There is research and development about the cognitive impacts of smartphones and digital technology.

Studies have shown that the brain is especially sensitive during the first 20 years of life, when it is still developing, and excessive screen time during this period is particularly harmful for cognitive development.

Engagement with digital media results in a temporary boost of "feel-good hormones" such as serotonin, endorphins, dopamine, and oxytocin, creating an addictive relationship where increased time spent engaging with digital media rewires the neurological pathways to crave this artificially induced positive release. This builds a reliance on technology to activate these mood-boosting hormones and ultimately decreases the ability to rely on natural strategies, such as exercise, to release these hormones. This direct relationship creates a feedback loop that rewards individuals for increased time spent engaging with digital media, forming a positive association and training individuals to expect this positive temporary boost.

Some educators and experts have raised some concerns about how technology may negatively affect students' thinking abilities and academic performance.

Social media use had also been studied in relation to language development. Studies have shown social media may affect one's skills. Especially among children and young adults. Excessive social media use may be linked to challenges on certain skills, while certain educational activities on social media may help with learning and language skills. Another study looked at how young adults used platforms such as Facebook, Twitter, and Youtube. Researchers found that certain activities on these platforms were associated with working memory performance. The study also found people who actively engaged with social media showed differences in attention compared to those who used it more passively. A study of 291 Taiwanese adolescents, aged 12 to 15 found that higher media multitasking was associated with lower working memory span, attention task accuracy, and inhibitory control performance. Also, the same study found that they present depressive symptoms.

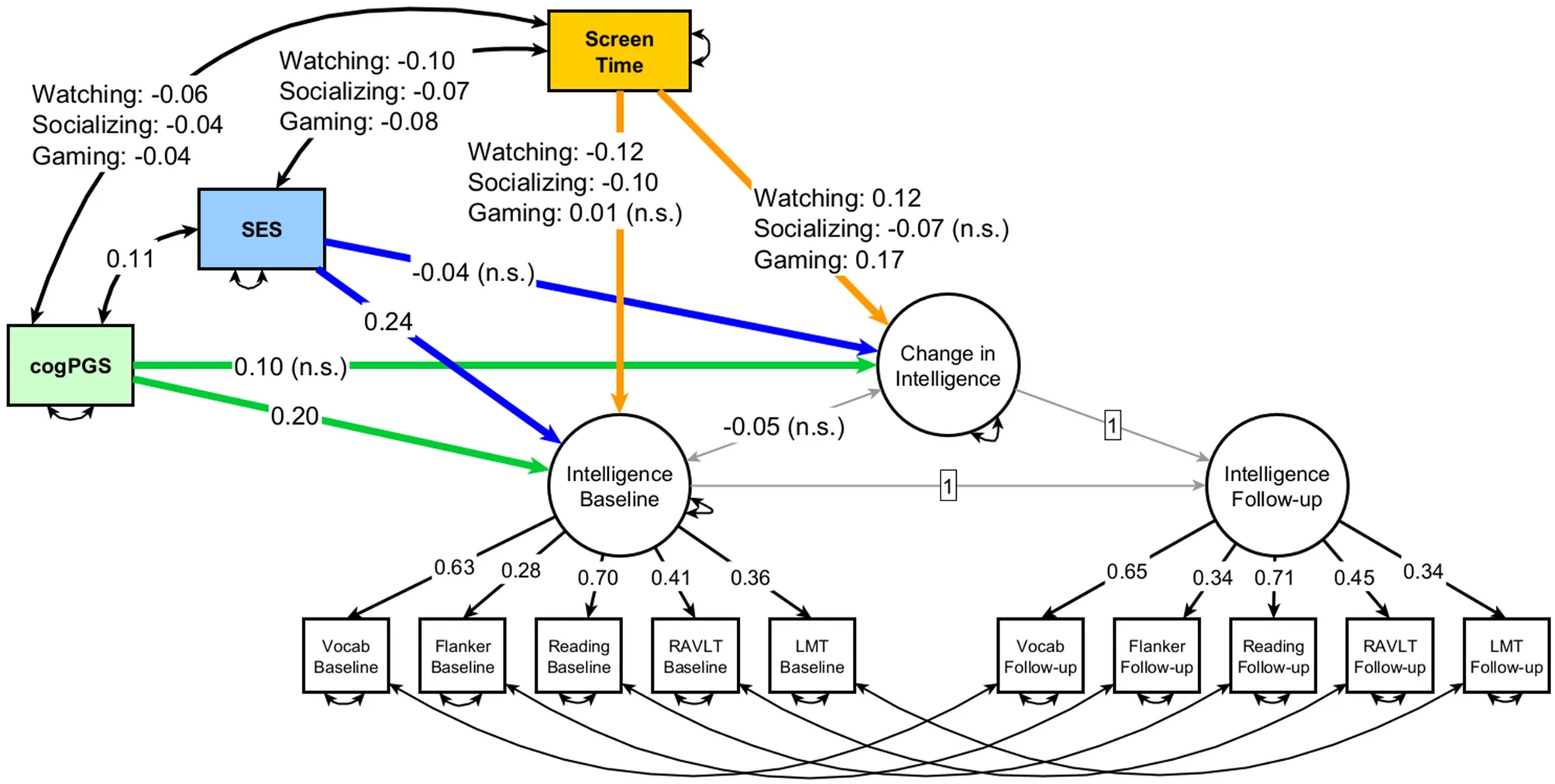
Measured results of the study

== Impact On Social Life ==
Worldwide adolescent loneliness in contemporary schools and depression increased substantially after 2012 and a study found this to be associated with smartphone access and Internet use.

Among older adults, increased use of digital media fosters social interaction and creates support systems that transcend physical proximity. Social media in particular creates openings to communicate with others, sharing experiences, bonding, and having conversations that result in an increased sense of connectedness, all of which decrease perceived feelings of loneliness and isolation in individuals.

Similarly, individuals who use social media frequently and do not limit screen time to certain days and times tend become more lonely and depressed. It was found that the reasoning an individual decides to use social media correlates to the effect it has on their wellbeing.

== Mitigation ==
=== Industry ===
Several technology firms have implemented changes intending to mitigate the adverse effects of excessive use of their platforms.

In December 2017, Facebook admitted passive consumption of social media could be harmful to mental health, although they said active engagement can have a positive effect. In January 2018, the platform made major changes to increase user engagement. In January 2019, Facebook's then head of global affairs, Nick Clegg, responding to criticisms of Facebook and mental health concerns, stated they would do "whatever it takes to make this environment safer online especially for youngsters". Facebook admitted "heavy responsibilities" to the global community, and invited regulation by governments. In 2018 Facebook and Instagram announced new tools that they asserted may assist with overuse of their products. In 2019, Instagram, which has been investigated specifically in one study in terms of addiction, began testing a platform change in Canada to hide the number of "likes" and views that photos and videos received in an effort to create a "less pressurised" environment. It then continued this trial in Australia, Italy, Ireland, Japan, Brazil and New Zealand before extending the experiment globally in November of that year. The platform also developed artificial intelligence to counter cyberbullying.

In 2018, Alphabet Inc. released an update for Android smartphones, including a dashboard app enabling users to set timers on application use, since named Digital Wellbeing. Apple Inc. purchased a third-party application and then incorporated it in iOS 12 to measure "screen time". Journalists have questioned the functionality of these products for users and parents, as well as the companies' motivations for introducing them. Alphabet has also invested in a mental health specialist, Quartet, which uses machine learning to collaborate and coordinate digital delivery of mental health care.

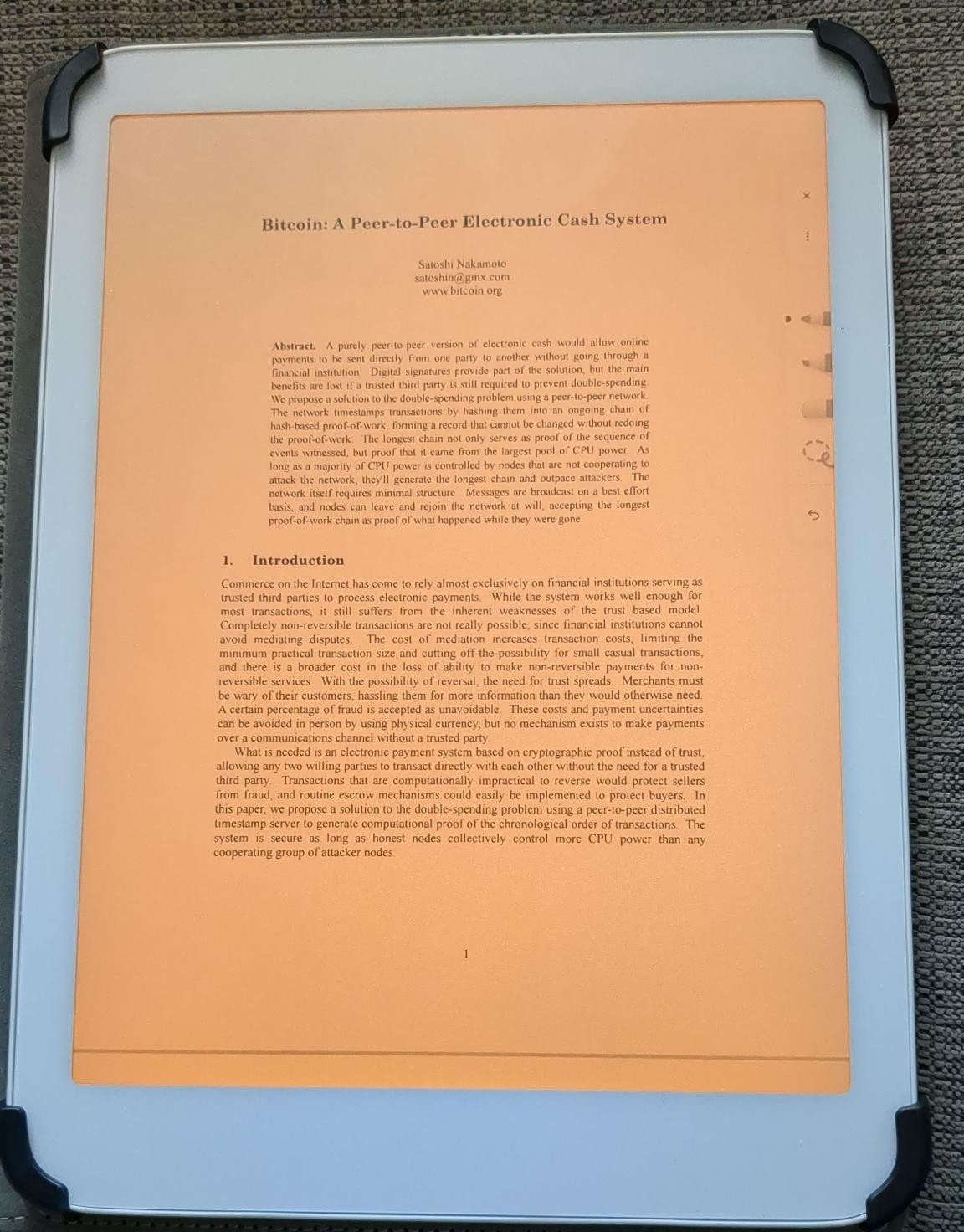
Indoor display of the Daylight DC1 computer

Two activist investors in Apple Inc voiced concerns in 2018 about the content and amount of time spent by youth. They called on Apple Inc. to act before regulators and consumers potentially force them to do so. Apple Inc. responded that they have, "always looked out for kids, and [they] work hard to create powerful products that inspire, entertain, and educate children while also helping parents protect them online". The firm is planning new features that they asserted may allow them to play a pioneering role in regard to young people's health.

In 2024, Daylight Computer Co. released the DC-1, a tablet with zero blue light and flicker to reduce some of the negative health and mental affects of screen usage including eye strain, distraction and the disruption of circadian rhythm from blue light. The company's goal is to create a "healthy computer."

=== Public Sector ===
In China, Japan, South Korea and the United States, governmental efforts have been enacted to address issues relating to digital media use and mental health.

China's Ministry of Culture has enacted several public health efforts from as early as 2006 to address gaming and internet-related disorders. In 2007, an "Online Game Anti-Addiction System" was implemented for minors, restricting their use to 3 hours or less per day. The ministry also proposed a "Comprehensive Prevention Program Plan for Minors' Online Gaming Addiction" in 2013, to promulgate research, particularly on diagnostic methods and interventions. China's Ministry of Education in 2018 announced that new regulations would be introduced to further limit the amount of time spent by minors in online games. In response, Tencent, the owner of WeChat and the world's largest video game publisher, restricted the amount of time that children could spend playing one of its online games, to one hour per day for children 12 and under, and two hours per day for children aged 13–18. On 2 September 2023, those under the age of 18 can no longer access the Internet on their mobile device between 10 pm and 6 am without parental bypass. Smartphone usage is similarly capped by default at 40 minutes a day for children younger than eight and at two hours for 16- and 17-year-olds.

Japan's Ministry of Internal Affairs and Communications coordinates Japanese public health efforts in relation to problematic internet use and gaming disorder. Legislatively, the Act on Development of an Environment that Provides Safe and Secure Internet Use for Young People was enacted in 2008, to promote public awareness campaigns, and support NGOs to teach young people safe internet use skills.

South Korea has eight government ministries responsible for public health efforts in relation to internet and gaming disorders. A review article published in Prevention Science in 2018 stated that the "region is unique in that its government has been at the forefront of prevention efforts, particularly in contrast to the United States, Western Europe, and Oceania." Efforts are coordinated by the Ministry of Science and ICT, and include awareness campaigns, educational interventions, youth counseling centres, and promoting healthy online culture.

In July 2022, Senators Richard Blumenthal and Marsha Blackburn introduced The Kids Online Safety Act (KOSA). This bill aims to protect minors from online harms by requiring social media platforms to mitigate online harms to minors through implementing safeguards (e.g. privacy settings), performing independent audits, and limiting the sharing of minors' personal information to third parties. The bill passed the Senate in July 2024, but is still up for consideration by the House. Despite not being passed yet, KOSA is already incredibly polarizing legislation, with groups like The Electronic Frontier Foundation (EFF) opposing KOSA, saying the bill would lead to: "broad online censorship of lawful speech, including content designed to help children navigate and overcome the very same harms it identifies."

In May 2023, the United States' Surgeon general took the rare measure of issuing an advisory on Social media and mental health. In October, 41 U.S. states commenced legal proceedings against Meta. This included the attorneys general of 33 states filing a combined lawsuit over concerns about the addictive nature of Instagram and its impact on the mental health of young people. In November 2024, Australia passed the world's first ban on social media for under-16s.

== Digital Mental Health Care ==
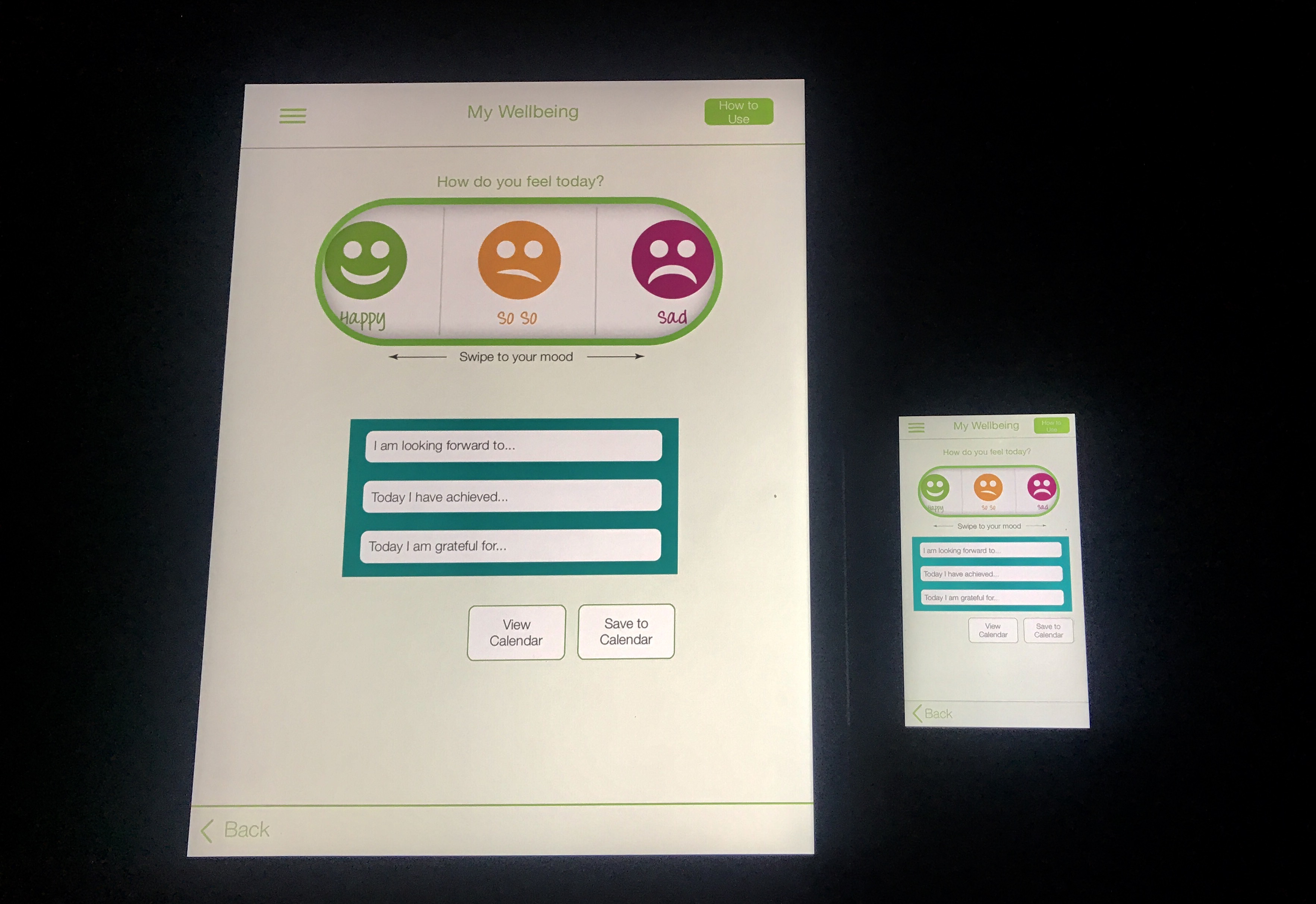
"Wellmind", a United Kingdom National Health Service smartphone application

Digital technologies have also provided opportunities for delivery of mental health care online; benefits have been found with computerized cognitive behavioral therapy for depression and anxiety. Mindfulness based online intervention has been shown to have small to moderate benefits on mental health. The greatest effect size was found for the reduction of psychological stress. Benefits were also found regarding depression, anxiety, and well-being.

The Lancet commission on global mental health and sustainability report from 2018 evaluated both benefits and harms of technology. It considered the roles of technologies in mental health, particularly in public education; patient screening; treatment; training and supervision; and system improvement. A study in 2019 published in Front Psychiatry in the National Center for Biotechnology Information states that despite proliferation of many mental health apps there has been no "equivalent proliferation of scientific evidence for their effectiveness."

Steve Blumenfield and Jeff Levin-Scherz, writing in the Harvard Business Review, claim that "most published studies show telephonic mental health care is as effective as in-person care in treating depression, anxiety and obsessive-compulsive disorder." The also cite a 2020 study done with the Veterans Administration as evidence of this as well.

== Epidemiology ==
In 1999, 58% of Finnish citizens had a mobile phone, including 75% of 15-17 year olds. In 2000, a majority of U.S. households had at least one personal computer and internet access the following year. In 2002, a majority of U.S. survey respondents reported having a mobile phone. In September and December 2006 respectively, Luxembourg and the Netherlands became the first countries to completely transition from analog to digital television, while the United States commenced its transition in 2008. In September 2007, a majority of U.S. survey respondents reported having broadband internet at home. In January 2013, a majority of U.S. survey respondents reported owning a smartphone. An estimated 40% of U.S. households in 2006 owned a dedicated home video game console, and by 2015, 51 percent of U.S. households owned a dedicated home video game console. In April 2015, one survey of U.S. teenagers ages 13 to 17 reported that nearly three-quarters of them either owned or had access to a smartphone, and 92 percent went online daily, with 24 percent saying they went online "almost constantly." In a 2024 survey, U.S. teenagers reported that 95 percent have access to smartphone, 97 percent spent time online daily, and 48 percent is spent online "almost constantly".

== Society and Culture ==
In August 2015, NeuroTribes identified autistic digital communities such as Autism Network International, Wrong Planet, and the Autism List mailing list at St. John's University (New York City). Steve Silberman argued that these communities "provided a natural home" where autistic members "could interact at their own pace." Jim Sinclair was a member of Autism List and participated in founding Autism Network International.

== See also ==
- Computer-induced medical problems
- Evolutionary psychiatry
- Instagram
- Screen time
- Social aspects of television
- Minimalist mobile phone
