= GAID =

GAID may refer to:

- Generative artificial intelligence dependency
- Global Alliance for Information and Communication Technologies and Development
