= Adam tablet =

Tablet computer by Notion Ink Design Labs

Adam Tablet
- Manufacturer: Notion Ink Design Labs
- Type: Tablet computer
- Released: 21 Jan 2011
- Introductory price: $375.33 to $549.99 (worldwide) plus $50 DHL Global Shipping
- Operating system: Android 2.2 "Froyo"
- CPU: 1 GHz, dual-core ARM Cortex-A9, Nvidia Tegra 250
- Memory: LP-DDR2/DDR2 667 MHz 1 GB
- Storage: Flash memory 8 GB, expandable microSD slot
- Display: 10.1-in 1024 × 600 px TFT Pixel Qi display or Normal 10.1-in 1024 × 600 LCD
- Sound: Stereo loudspeaker 1 watt each, 3.5 mm headphone jack, built-in microphone
- Input: Multi-touch touchscreen, headset controls, accelerometer, ambient light sensor
- Camera: 3.2 MP swivel
- Connectivity: Wi-Fi (802.11b/g/n), Bluetooth 2.1+A2DP, USB 2.0, HDMI; 3G model also includes: UMTS (HSDPA) 850 or 900 MHz depending on the model chosen
- Power: 3 cell removable li-polymer battery
- Dimensions: 191 mm (7.5 in) H 269 mm (10.6 in) W 14 mm (0.55 in) D
- Weight: 600–750 g (1.32–1.65 lb)
- Website: www.notionink.com

The Adam Tablet is a tablet computer designed by Bangalore-based firm Notion Ink Design Labs. The worldwide launch occurred on December 18, 2010 via a video released by Notion Ink detailing their Eden Interface. On December 9 a limited number of devices were released for pre-order globally, followed by a larger pre-order starting January 9, 2011 and an open subscription pre-order from 11 January 2011. The Adam runs a customized version of Android 2.2 Froyo, and has released beta versions of Android 3.0 Honeycomb and Android 4.0 Ice Cream Sandwich The beta versions released were largely done through the efforts of volunteer developers. The Adam is set to be the first Android device marketed to contain Pixel Qi's low-power, dual-mode display. The device is one of several tablet form-factor devices to include a dual-core Nvidia Tegra 2 processor that can support 1080p video output mirroring.

The Adam was shown at the 2011 Consumer Electronics Show (CES) in Las Vegas where it received favorable initial reviews.

== Features ==
The Adam includes an Nvidia Tegra 250 processor with a 1 GHz Dual Core Cortex A9. Running Android 2.2 Froyo, the Adam incorporates a Notion Ink created overlay interface, called Eden, which is forward compatible; it incorporates modules from the successor to Android 2.3 Gingerbread. Rohan Shravan, CEO of Notion Ink, has stated that his company is currently working on porting Android 3.0, Honeycomb to the product.

The Notion Ink Design Labs Adam has two choices of screen, a transflective liquid crystal display made by Pixel Qi or a backlit liquid crystal display (LCD). Both screen choices are 10.1 in (260 mm) diagonal with a resolution of 1024x600. The device measures 19.1×26.9×1.4 cm (7.52×10.59×0.55 in) and weighs 730 g (1.61 lb).

A 185° swivel-camera can face a user during video chatting at -5°, can face a live lecture or meeting while the unit is on a table at 90°, or can snap photographs at 180°. The camera does not work on the beta version for Ice Cream Sandwich.

The Adam can be plugged into a high-definition television (HDTV) through a high-definition multimedia interface (HDMI) port.

The Adam's USB ports are enabled in host mode which allows the connection of USB flash drives and hard drives. This feature also can be used to connect a keyboard and a mouse to the Adam.

The Adam was supposed to come bundled with Adobe Flash but the first shipped devices did not have it pre-installed. However, Adam owners were able to sideload a Tegra 2-optimized version of Adobe Flash with no problems. It is expected to support Adobe AIR when it launches. The Tegra 250's supports flash acceleration.

== Controversy ==
The Notion Ink Adam was beset by a number of controversies and delays since its preorder launch in December 2010. These included shipping problems, confusion over the specifications of the machine, reportedly poor customer support and questionable build quality.

The first units shipped were subject to an OTA updating error in which the update file failed to completely download to the device (i.e. a product of the distribution system, not one of the content of the update), which resulted in the device becoming inoperable. As a result of communication between Notion Ink support and numerous community forum commenters, a fixed update was provided by Notion Ink to rectify the problem, in the form of an 80MB download. Many customers also questioned the gap between the quality of the screen and Notion Ink's advertised 'pure-matte glass', as the screen still had a glossy effect. Answering this criticism, Rohan Shravan described the screen as having 2 internal layers of matte surfaces; for the external glass, the gloss was to be corrected with a customer-applied matte screen protector.

The Adam also shipped without a number of promised or fully functioning applications - included in those missing were the company's own Genesis market and the comic-book reader, Longbox. As of January 2011, it was unclear if these applications would make it to consumers.

In late January 2011, leaked photographs supposedly taken during US Federal Communications Commission (FCC) inspections created a fresh round of criticism, with commentators remarking on the inferiority of the build to established brands, with respect in particular to hand soldered wires and components. In the official Notion Ink blog, CEO Rohan Shravan defended the Adam's build quality as a product of a start-up company and stating that the wires are solid and belong to the antenna.

== Hardware ==
Size and weight

- Thickness: 14 mm (0.55 in)
- Width: 191 mm (7.5 in)
- Length: 269 mm (10.6 in)
- Weight: 1.6 lb (730 g)

System on chip:

- Nvidia Tegra 250
- 1 GHz Dual Core Cortex A-9
- Nvidia Geforce ULP GPU

Memory and storage:

- 1 GB DDR2
- 1 GB SLC
- 8 GB flash, more variants may be coming at some time

Power and battery:

- Universal Charger
- 3 cell 24.6Whr removable battery

Display:

- 10.1 in (260 mm) WSVGA (1024 × 600)
- Optional Pixel Qi display:

- Transmissive
- Transflective
- Reflective

- Multi-touch
- Screen protector with matte finish
- Anti glare coating
- Scratch resistant
- Finger print resistant

Camera

- 185° Swivel Camera (3.2 MP) (720p)

Communication

- WLAN - 802.11 b/g/n
- Bluetooth 2.1 + EDR
- WWAN - 3G HSPA (850 MHz and 1900 MHz) or (900 MHz and 2100 MHz)
- FM radio

Audio

- Stereo loudspeakers
- 3.5-mm headphone/microphone jack
- Built-in microphone

Input/output ports:

- USB 2.0 Host x 2,
- Mini USB
- HDMI
- microSD slot
- Subscriber Identity Module (SIM) card slot; 3g model only
- DC connector

Sensors

- 3-axis accelerometer
- Ambient light sensor
- GPS
- Digital compass

== Software ==
The new unit will come with a customized version of Android 2.2 Froyo operating system known as Eden which includes many features of Android 2.3 Gingerbread. It was originally planned to be able to support ChromeOS and Ubuntu but no working build of either has been created for the Adam. The Android Market was to be implemented in late May upon release of Android 3.0 Honeycomb, but these plans were dropped. Notion Ink had also announced their own application marketplace, named Genesis, but this was never opened. They announced $1 million in prize funds for developers, as per their older website, but plans were canceled due to budget issues.

- Email client (Mail’d)
- Office suite (QuickOffice)
- File browser (Sniffer)
- Calendar
- WebKit browser
- Weather
- Music
- Navigation and maps
- E-Reader
- Paint (Canvas)
- Longbox Comic E-Reader
- Photo editor
- Calculator
- Video
- Camera
- Contacts
- Settings
- Sound recorder
- Clock
- Search
- Speech recognition
- Gallery

In May 2011, Notion Ink Announced that the Adam will be shipping with Android 2.2 Froyo, Eden 1.5, an Amazon Kindle App, and the Dolphin Browser HD. Android 3 Honeycomb support is expected to arrive before the end of June.

== Future of NotionInk ==
NotionInk later went on to release other devices with latest hardware, most notably the Adam II, and Cain 2-in-1. Despite the Adam misstep, NotionInk has managed to survive 7 years, since its inception on July 26, 2016.

== See also ==
- Comparison of tablet computers
- Tablet computer
- List of Android devices
