= Mary Lou Jepsen =

American scientist and entrepreneur

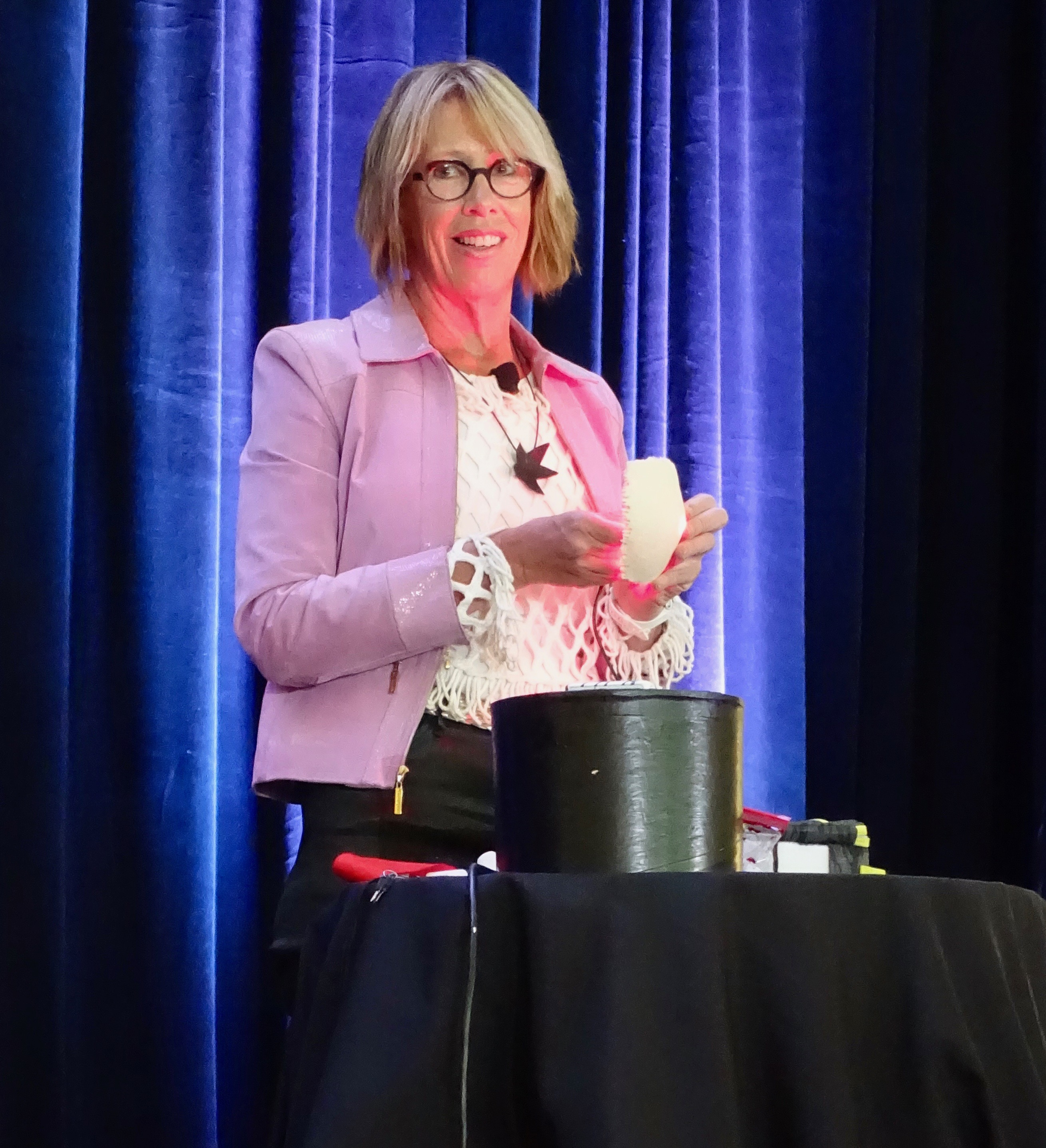
- Jepsen at Brain Mind Summit
- Education: Brown University and MIT
- Occupations: technologist, entrepreneur
- Website: MaryLouJepsen.com

Mary Lou Jepsen is an American technologist and entrepreneur in the field of medical technology and computational imaging. She is the founder and Executive Chairman of Openwater.

Jepsen is known for her pioneering work in the design and commercialization of display, projection and imaging systems. Her contributions include laptops, projection displays, televisions, screens, touch-enabled systems, holographic and light-field displays, and other immersive visual technologies.

She has held research, and executive engineering roles at the MIT Media Lab, Google, Meta (Facebook), Intel. She was also the co-founder, chief technology officer and Chief Architect of the former nonprofit initiative One Laptop per Child.

== Early life & education ==
Jepsen earned undergraduate degrees from Brown University, receiving a Sc.B. in Electrical Engineering (with Honors) and an A.B. in Studio Art. In 1989, she earned a M.S. from the MIT Media Lab, where she conducted research in holographic imaging and displays systems, and co-created one of the first fully computed and digital holographic video systems, demonstrating dynamic three-dimensional holographic synthesis and reconstruction. This system inspired a new subfield of holographic video and received numerous awards.

Jepsen later earned a Ph.D. from Brown University in Optical Sciences where her graduate work focused applied optics, materials and imaging systems. She created large-area electronically tunable meta materials - liquid crystal filled sub-wavelength diffractive structures and a new theory of mathematically defining their design and performance She also demonstrated that it was technically feasible – but agreed it was culturally unacceptable – to project TV images on the Moon's surface.

== Career ==
=== Academic & research appointments ===
Prior to completing her doctorate, Jepsen held international academic and research appointments. She served as a computer science professor at the Royal Melbourne Institute of Technology (RMIT) in Australia, where she taught and conducted research in three-dimensional computer graphics.

She was a Senior Fellow at the Academy of Media Arts Cologne in Germany, where she worked on display holography and experimental visual systems. She has created some of the largest ambient displays ever. In Cologne, she built a holographic replica of pre-existing buildings in the city's historic district and created a holographic display encompassing a city block.

Jepsen was also a San Diego Fellow at the University of California, San Diego (UCSD), where she conducted research in early quantum and optical computing, using holographic techniques for computation and information processing.

=== MicroDisplay Corp. & Intel ===
Jepsen co-founded MicroDisplay Corporation and served as its Chief Technology Officer, leading the development of the world’s first low-cost, single-panel microdisplay technology. Under her technical leadership, the company designed and built a manufacturing facility in Richmond, California, enabling volume production of compact, high-resolution microdisplay devices.

Jepsen later joined Intel, where she served as Chief Technology Officer of Intel’s Display Division, leading technology strategy and development across display and imaging systems spanning microdisplays, projection architectures, flat-panel displays, and semiconductor integration.

=== MIT Media Lab & One Laptop per Child ===
Jepsen co-founded the nonprofit initiative One Laptop per Child and served as its chief architect and chief technology officer and its first employee. The organization had the goal of transforming education for children around the world by creating and distributing educational devices for the developing world, and by creating software and content for those devices.She led the design and system architecture of the $100 laptop, integrating display technology, power management, networking, and manufacturing into a deployable platform an order of magnitude cheaper than laptops of the day.

The OLPC laptop achieved the lowest power consumption of any laptop, outdoor usability including innovative sunlight readable screen invention, incorporated mesh networking, and supported alternative charging methods, enabling large-scale global deployment. OLPC generated over a billion dollars in cumulative revenue, reflecting the scale at which the system was manufactured and deployed, and influenced the emergence of low-cost, mobile computing platforms. Devices remain in use in multiple countries more than two decades later.

Many of the architectural approaches pioneered at OLPC later appeared, in adapted form, across mainstream mobile computing platforms. Google CEO Sundar Pichai credits the $100 laptop as the progenitor of Chromebooks.

=== Pixel Qi & Google ===
Building on her work at OLPC and the Media Lab, Jepsen founded Pixel Qi, a display technology company focused on hybrid and transflective display systems for laptops, tablets, and mobile devices. She was also the company's CEO. Pixel Qi was later absorbed by Google.

At Google, Jepsen worked closely with the company’s founders, including Sergey Brin, and served in executive engineering roles. She founded, invented, and led multiple internal hardware initiatives spanning advanced display and imaging systems integrated with Android. Among these was “Lego TV,” a modular display system consisting of seamless, snap-together high-resolution screens designed to form scalable video walls.

=== Meta (Facebook) & Oculus ===
Jepsen later joined Facebook (now Meta), where she served as Executive Director of Engineering at Facebook and Oculus. She made foundational contributions to the development of the Oculus Quest 2, a standalone virtual-reality headset that has sold more than 20 million units worldwide. She also led research and prototype development for next-generation AR and VR systems, including sunglass-form-factor devices featuring wide field of view, foveated rendering, and novel tileable projection architectures designed to project imagery onto the retina.

=== Openwater ===
In 2016, Jepsen founded Openwater, a medical technology company developing noninvasive diagnostic, therapeutic and brain computer interface platforms that integrate focused ultrasound, infrared optics, and computational imaging. The aspiration of the firm's work is to use the same technology set for many cancers, mental diseases and cardiovascular disease. Its progress in 2024 shrank initial, cart-sized units to a small wearable with a console, and lowering price 100-fold, and in 2025 moved to volume production in Taiwan. The devices first went into human studies at Hartford Hospital in 2020, and were then refined for the next few years with a multi-center study at Brown University and the University of Pennsylvania.

In addition, the company developed a low-intensity focused ultrasound platform that they tested at UCLA in pre-clinical work showing the ability to treat glioblastoma in both organoids and then mice using a resonant frequency yet diagnostic dose of ultrasound that melted away the glioblastoma tumors in mice.

In an open "Founder's Letter" in January 2024, Dr. Mary Lou Jepsen announced having raised "$54 million in the past several months bringing the total to $100M raised" to create an AGPL licensed open source platform that can slash the cost of disease treatment.

Jepsen remains closely associated with Openwater, the medical-technology company she founded, which develops non-invasive imaging and therapeutic systems combining light, sound, and electromagnetic techniques.

In 2025, day-to-day executive leadership of Openwater transitioned to Aaron Timm, while Jepsen moved into a non-executive leadership role as chair of the board. In this capacity, she continues to guide the company’s long-term technical direction, clinical strategy, and partnerships, with an emphasis on accelerating commercialization and large-scale clinical deployment.

During this period, Openwater expanded external investment and publicized progress toward portable, lower-cost imaging and therapy platforms aimed at oncology and neurological applications.

== Other works ==
For decades now onward, Jepsen has remained an active public speaker on technology. She has given two main-stage TED talks each with 1 Million views. She has delivered invited talks at Austin Ideas, Milken Global, DLD, SxSW, Abundance A360, JP Morgan Health, The Commonwealth Club, Wired Health and many other events globally.

She has also delivered public talks and interviews at institutions including The Commonwealth Club, presenting Openwater’s technical roadmap and the role of computational imaging in future clinical practice.

== Advocacy and views ==
In her public commentary and thought leadership, Jepsen has challenged conventional paradigms in medical innovation, healthcare access, and technology development. Jepsen argues that traditional, proprietary medical-device development models are too slow, expensive, and risk-averse to address urgent global health challenges effectively. Instead, she promotes open-source, collaborative approaches that leverage shared technology, data, and manufacturing practices to accelerate innovation, reduce costs, and democratize access to advanced diagnostics and therapies.

Jepsen asserts that the bottleneck in delivering breakthrough medical technologies is not primarily regulatory agencies, such as the U.S. Food and Drug Administration (FDA), but rather the outdated innovation model itself. She has called for the creation of open, modular platforms and shared safety and performance data repositories that would allow innovators to build on common foundations, reduce redundancy, and supply regulators with richer evidence to inform faster decisions. This approach, she believes, could compress device development timelines from over a decade to just a few years and cut development costs by orders of magnitude.

Jepsen’s advocacy extends to open access to intellectual property and collaborative engineering. In public discussions and interviews, she has explained that open-sourcing patents, software, and hardware designs for medical devices under permissive frameworks like the Affero General Public License can expand participation in research and reduce development barriers. Openwater, the company she leads, has publicly discussed embracing open innovation, aiming to share core technology while enabling diverse contributors to iterate and improve upon it.

Beyond innovation models, Jepsen advocates for scalable, consumer-electronics manufacturing as a way to lower the unit costs of advanced medical devices. She argues that applying established semiconductor production techniques to healthcare technology similar to those used in smartphones and other mass-market electronics can make high-performance diagnostic and therapeutic tools affordable and globally accessible.

Jepsen also addresses inequalities in technology and healthcare participation, highlighting barriers faced by women in technology industries and advocating for broader inclusion and representation. In a public statement she noted that many senior women leave technology sectors due to isolation and systemic bias, underscoring her belief in the importance of diversity and equity in innovation ecosystems.

Additionally, Jepsen has publicly shared personal reflections on healthcare systems, including the challenges of accessing quality health insurance and the impact of system design on patient outcomes.

== Board Service ==
- Chairman of the Board of Openwater.health since 2016
- Board director Lear Corporation since 2016. Largest US-based automotive suppler.
- Board director UC Berkeley College of Computing, Data Science, and Society since inception.
- Member of Council of the Focused Ultrasound Foundation.
- Previous she has served on many boards and task forces. She also has broad foreign and domestic advisory experience in Peru, China, Uruguay, Taiwan, Brazil and the United States.

== Awards and recognitions ==
- 100 Most Influential People in the World (Time magazine's "Time 100").
- Technology Pioneer 2019 (World Economic Forum)
- 2018 Forbes America's Top 50 Women In Tech
- 2018 Forbes 50 over 50
- One of 2013's top 10 thinkers (as named by CNN), for her work in rethinking functional brain imaging with compact systems that could lead to direct communication via human thought.
- One of the top 50 female computer scientists of all time (as determined by the Anita Borg Institute).
- In 2014 she received an honorary Doctorate of Science from Brown University.
- Edwin H. Land Medal from the Optical Society (OSA).
- Canada's Athabasca University awarded Jepsen an honorary doctorate in 2008.
- Fellow of the Optical Society (OSA).
- Brown University's top alumni awards: Horace Mann Medal (awarded by Brown Graduate School) and BEAM award (awarded by Brown University School of Engineering).
- 2011 Award for Innovation from the Anita Borg Institute.
- 2010 World Technology Award: for individual contributions to hardware
- 2010 Display of the year award - Society for Information Display (SID)
- 2010 IEEE ACE Award Grand Prize for best emerging technology (awarded to Pixel Qi)
- 2008 Design of the year award - London Design Museum
- 2007 INDEX Design Award - €100,000 for OLPC $100 laptop

She has also received numerous awards for the work she did at One Laptop per Child and has been named to many other "top" lists in computing by Fast Company, New York Times, IEEE Spectrum and others.

== Personal life ==
Jepsen is married to John Patrick Conor Ryan, formerly a partner at Monitor Group. In 1995, she suffered from a pituitary gland tumor and had it removed and thus suffers from panhypopituitarism, requiring a twice-daily regimen of hormone replacement; her personal description of this and the ongoing challenges she faces was published in the New York Times.
