= Pixel Qi =

American technology company

Pixel Qi Corporation
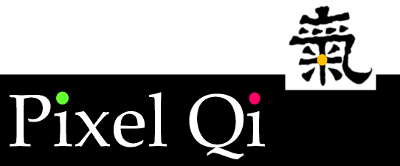
- Type: Privately held company
- Industry: Electronic visual displays
- Founder: Mary Lou Jepsen
- Headquarters: San Bruno, California, United States
- Website: www.pixelqi.com www.tripuso.com

Pixel Qi Corporation (pronounced Pixel "Chi") was an American company involved in the research of low-power computer display technology, based in San Bruno, California. It was founded by Mary Lou Jepsen, who was previously the chief technical officer of the One Laptop per Child project.

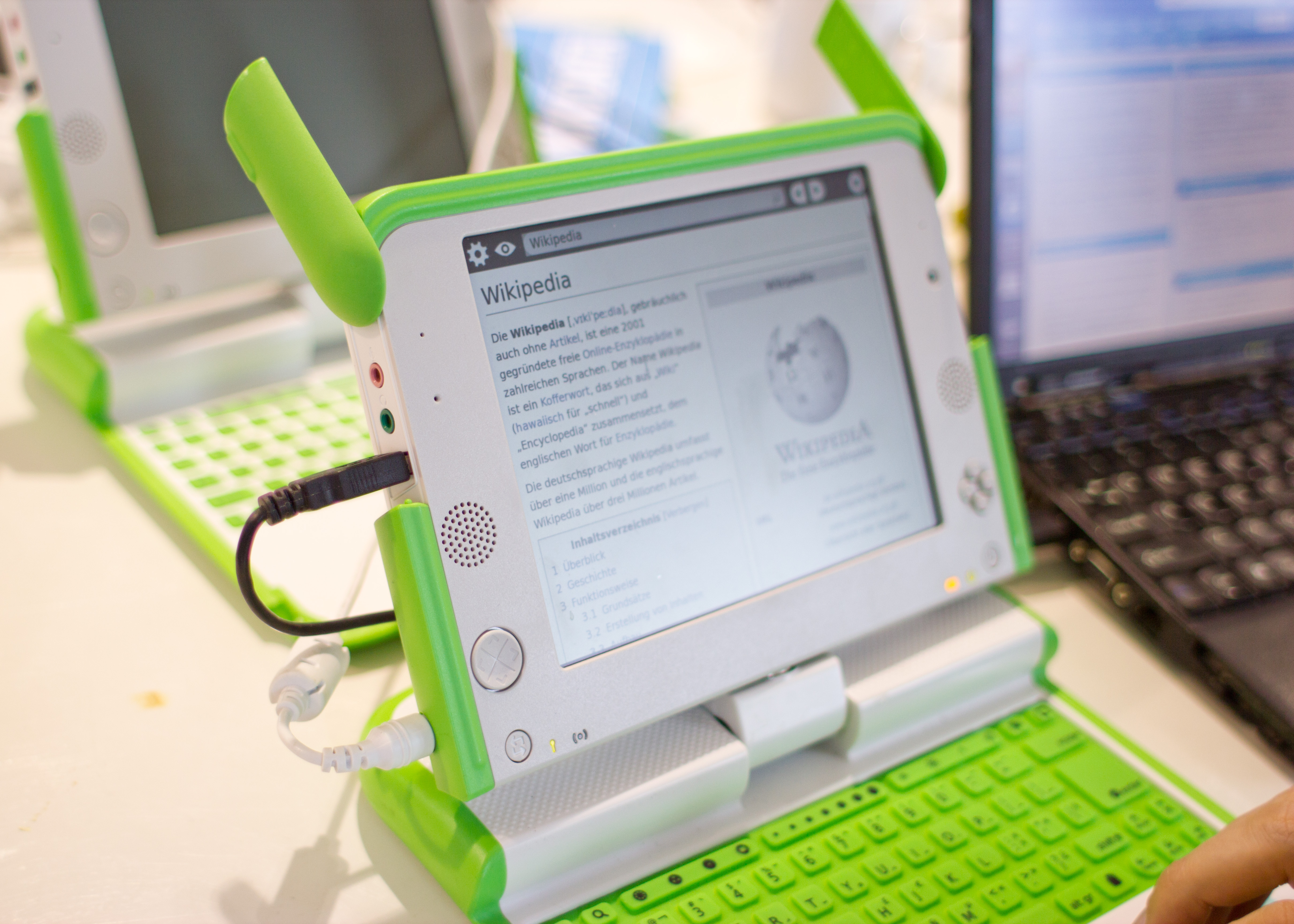
A Pixel Qi screen installed in an OLPC XO laptop operating in reflective mode, the screen is in grey scale mode and is not retro illuminated

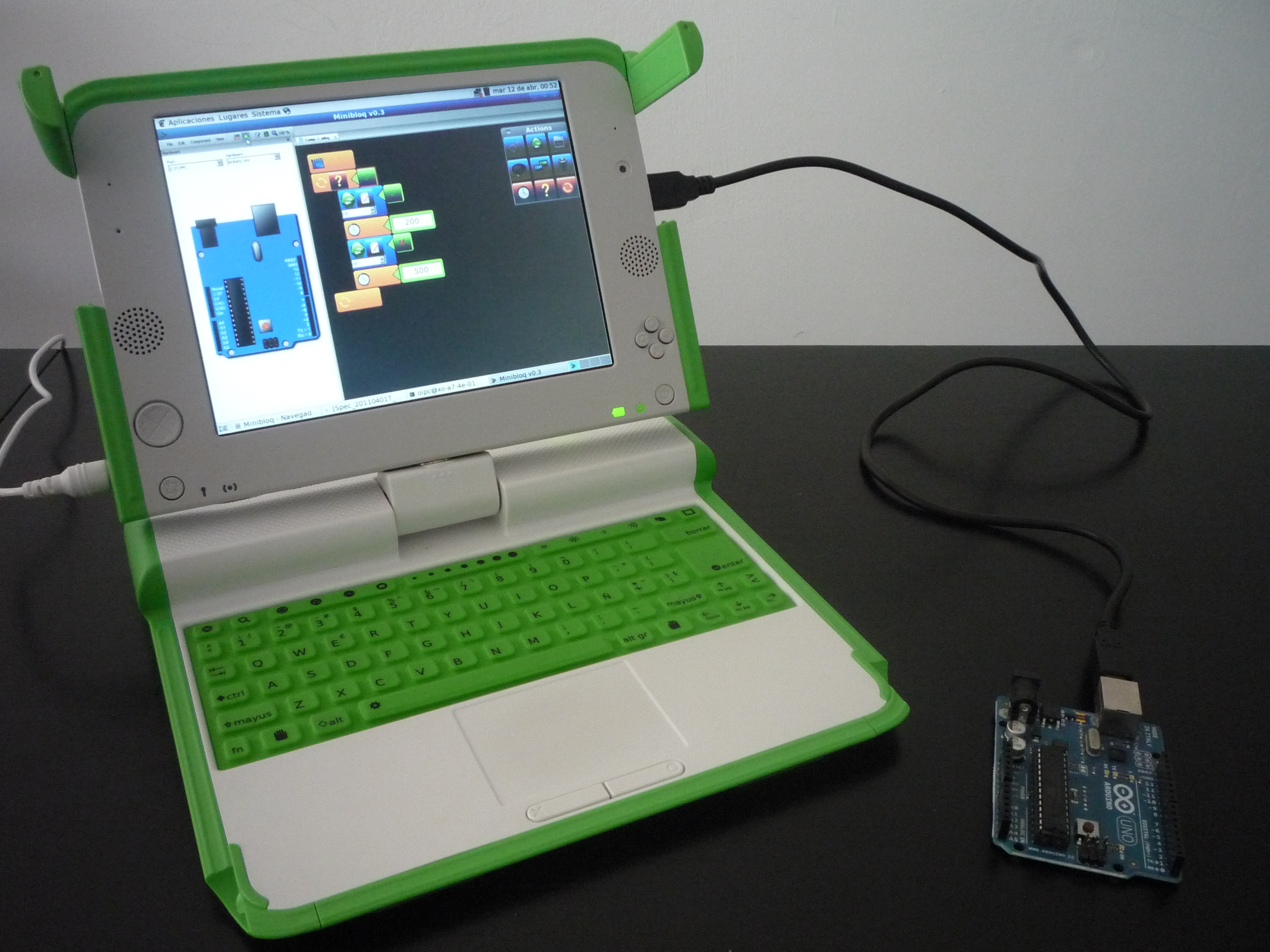
A Pixel Qi screen installed in an OLPC XO laptop operating in transmissive mode, the screen is in color mode and is retro illuminated

The company designed liquid crystal displays (LCDs) that can be largely manufactured using the existing manufacturing infrastructure for conventional LCDs. The advantage of Pixel Qi displays over conventional LCDs is mainly that they can be set to operate under transflective mode and reflective mode, improving eye-comfort, power usage, and visibility under bright ambient light.

By 2015, PixelQi's team and offices were unreachable, and the company is presumed defunct. The intellectual property is now owned by the original investor of Pixel Qi, while the right to manufacture Pixel Qi technology contractually rests with Tripuso Display Solutions.

== Devices ==
- The first commercial device to use a Pixel Qi display, ARM-based Adam tablet by Notion Ink, was released mid-January 2011.
- Another tablet with a Pixel Qi display has been announced by Innoversal, named Lattice.;
- Clover Systems has launched SunBook, a netbook with a Pixel Qi display.
- The first ruggedized, MIL-SPEC tablet utilizing Pixel Qi, the Hydra-T3, was created by InHand Electronics, Inc. and launched Q1 of 2012.
