= NeuroTribes =

2015 book by Steve Silberman

- First edition
- Author: Steve Silberman
- Language: English
- Genre: Narrative nonfiction
- Publisher: Avery Publishing
- Publication date: August 25, 2015
- Publication place: United States
- Media type: Hardcover
- Pages: 542 pp.
- ISBN: 978-1-58333-467-6 (Hardcover)

NeuroTribes: The Legacy of Autism and the Future of Neurodiversity is a book by Steve Silberman that discusses autism and neurodiversity from historic, scientific, and advocacy-based perspectives. NeuroTribes was awarded the Samuel Johnson Prize in 2015, and has received wide acclaim from both the scientific and the popular press. It was named to a number of "best books of 2015" lists, including The New York Times Book Review and The Guardian.

== Synopsis ==
NeuroTribes explores the history of autism, from before the diagnosis was defined, up to the growing modern concept of neurodiversity. It highlights historical scientists such as Henry Cavendish who display many of the signs psychologists associate with autism today. While autism was still an emerging concept, several important figures in the beginnings of the ham radio community, science fiction, and fandom as whole, were diagnosed as or suspected to be autistic. In the modern era, building off Silberman's earlier article "The Geek Syndrome", he discusses the frequency of autism and autistic-like traits in Silicon Valley.

The works and legacy of Hans Asperger and Leo Kanner, who both described autism near simultaneously, are compared. Silberman alleges that while Asperger recognized children as being individuals with unique talents, Kanner portrayed them in a much more negative light.

As knowledge of autism became more widespread, the view prevailed that it was a rare and debilitating disability. It is only more recently, in the past few decades, that this idea has opened up to more of a "spectrum" of symptoms. On the one hand this, along with other factors, has led to the fear among some that autism is overdiagnosed. On the other, it has made room for a wider community of autistic people. This community, along with family and other allies, advocated that autistic people could be happy, with much to offer the world, when given the resources and support they need.

Stories from those with a variety of symptoms and ages show other ways that autistic people have found enjoyable, healthy, and meaningful lives. The concept of neurodiversity, that differences in cognition are not necessarily pathological and offer strengths as well as weaknesses, is an important theme throughout the book.

== Reactions ==
In The New York Times Book Review, Jennifer Senior wrote that the book was "beautifully told, humanizing, important"; The Boston Globe called it "as emotionally resonant as any [book] this year"; and in Science, the cognitive neuroscientist Francesca Happé wrote, "It is a beautifully written and thoughtfully crafted book, a historical tour of autism, richly populated with fascinating and engaging characters, and a rallying call to respect difference." It was named one of the best books of 2015 by The New York Times, The Economist, Financial Times, and The Guardian.

By contrast, Lisa Conlan, reviewing the book for the British Journal of Psychiatry, criticized Silberman's retrospective diagnosis of historical figures and argued that his portrayal of neurodiversity is based in identity politics. James Harris of Johns Hopkins University criticized NeuroTribes as a book that pushes an agenda, saying that Silberman misrepresented Leo Kanner as having a negative view towards persons with autism and their parents, rather than, as Harris argued, being an advocate for individualized treatment for every child.

In 2017, Paramount Pictures acquired the rights to NeuroTribes and announced interest in making the book into a movie with Broadway Video.

== Awards and honors ==
- 2015 Samuel Johnson Prize
- 2015 Books for a Better Life Psychology Award, Southern New York National Multiple Sclerosis Society
- 2016 Health Book of the Year, Medical Journalists' Association
- 2016 Silver Medal, Nonfiction, California Book Awards
- 2016 Erikson Institute Prize for Excellence in Mental Health Media
- 2016 ARC Catalyst Awards Author of the Year

== See also ==
- Autism rights movement
- Ole Ivar Løvaas
