= Generative artificial intelligence dependency =

Mental health condition

Generative artificial intelligence dependency (GAID) is an emerging mental health disorder where users have a compulsive reliance on generative AI tools for tasks involving creativity, critical thinking, and emotional support. The excessive offloading of individual agency to AI may stunt psychosocial development and critical thinking.

This term is not to be confused with the habitual use of digital media such as doomscrolling. Generative artificial intelligence dependency involves dependency that interferes with other aspects of life.

== Research ==
GAID does not have a formal diagnosis in the International Classification of Diseases or the Diagnostic and Statistical Manual of Mental Disorders. Similar to other internet-related conditions, the diagnostic boundaries between "problematic use" and "dependence" remain blurred and largely contested in the field of psychiatry.

Some researchers argue that labeling overuse of generative AI as a disorder is premature. While most opponents of the diagnosis recognize that well-structured addiction scales have been developed, they contend that these scales lack conceptual coherence and call for clearer theoretical frameworks when developing assessment models.

Research suggests that generative AI use leads to harmful effects on human comprehension, reasoning, and memory retention, which in turn may result in further reliance. Researchers found that users who primarily received information from LLM summaries over a standard web search developed “shallower knowledge,” suggesting that the LLM’s synthesis of information came at the cost of the user’s ability to process it themself

== Outcomes ==
As AI becomes more common in the workplace, researchers warn over-reliance can lead to cognitive decline within organizations. This phenomenon is known as "cognitive outsourcing" where users let AI think, write, and analyze for them without engaging their own critical thinking skills. This surrendering of cognitive abilities makes it more difficult for the user to accomplish previously straightforward tasks without AI use.

Extensive use of generative AI can erode specialized abilities and "deskill" highly trained professionals after extended periods of use. For example, researchers found that endoscopists who regularly used generative AI had significantly decreased detection rates when asked to perform a non-AI-assisted colonoscopy.

Those showing symptoms of GAID tend to display increased executive dysfunction and are more likely to procrastinate. Researchers also found that GAID was positively associated with more frequent cognitive errors and critical thinking skills.

=== Youth population ===
GAID in the youth population is currently an open question, with new research being discovered monthly.

According to a February 2026 survey of US teens, more than half are using chatbots to search information or get help with schoolwork. An October 2026 survey of French youth found 40% of 11 and 12 year-olds admitted to using generative AI at least once a week.

Research is ongoing on the effect of AI on cognitive offloading, memory encoding and retrieval, desirable difficulty, and skill acquisition. A June 2025 study in Turkey gave 1000 high school math students the permission to use AI for solving problems. The students' grades increased by 48% when using AI, but then the grades fell by 17% from the baseline when the tool was removed. Students who get instant gratification from a quick AI answer can often miss out on skills of “patience, perseverance, and emotional regulation” in the learning process.

==== Chatbots ====
According to a 2025 survey of US teen by Common Sense Media, one-third of teens have used AI to practice conversations, roleplay, and gain emotional support and guidance. A majority of teens admitted to discussing their crises with AI instead of real people. 72% of teens have come into contact with AI, with 13% of those teens considering themselves as daily users AI's constant validation of the user leads to an environment where the user never understands the perspective of others since their opinions are not challenged. Incorporating their emotional support into these tools causes many concerns for the future, where AI could redefine human relationships by exacerbating the loneliness epidemic and worsen the mental health of users.

The youth population is also experiencing GAID from AI companion sources such as Nomi.AI, Character.AI, and Replika. Users with “depression, anxiety, attention deficit/hyperactivity disorder, bipolar disorder, or susceptibility to psychosis" are specifically affected by AI due to its frictionless and constant attention. It can lead to these mental behaviors becoming stronger For example, a 14-year old boy became extremely connected to his AI companion and engaged in abusive and sexual interactions with it. According to his mother, the boy became completely dependent on the chatbot for his social interactions. The user was last seen conversing with a companion from Character.AI before his death.

== Regulations ==
Some US states have passed laws on AI chatbot transparency for user safety and the protection of minors to address emotional dependency and self-harm stemming from excessive usage. This issue is a key component of the KIDS Act to audit the outputs of emotionally engaging AI models. This was in response to an incident when a 14-year old boy became extremely connected to his AI companion and engaged in abusive and sexual interactions with it.

== See also ==
- Digital media use and mental health
- AI-induced psychosis
- Deaths linked to chatbots
- AI anthropomorphism
