= Daylight Computer Co. =

Health-focused technology company

- Type: Benefit Corporation
- Industry: Consumer electronics; Software services
- Founded: June 1, 2018 (8 years ago), in San Francisco, California, U.S.
- Founders: Anjan Katta
- Headquarters: San Francisco, California

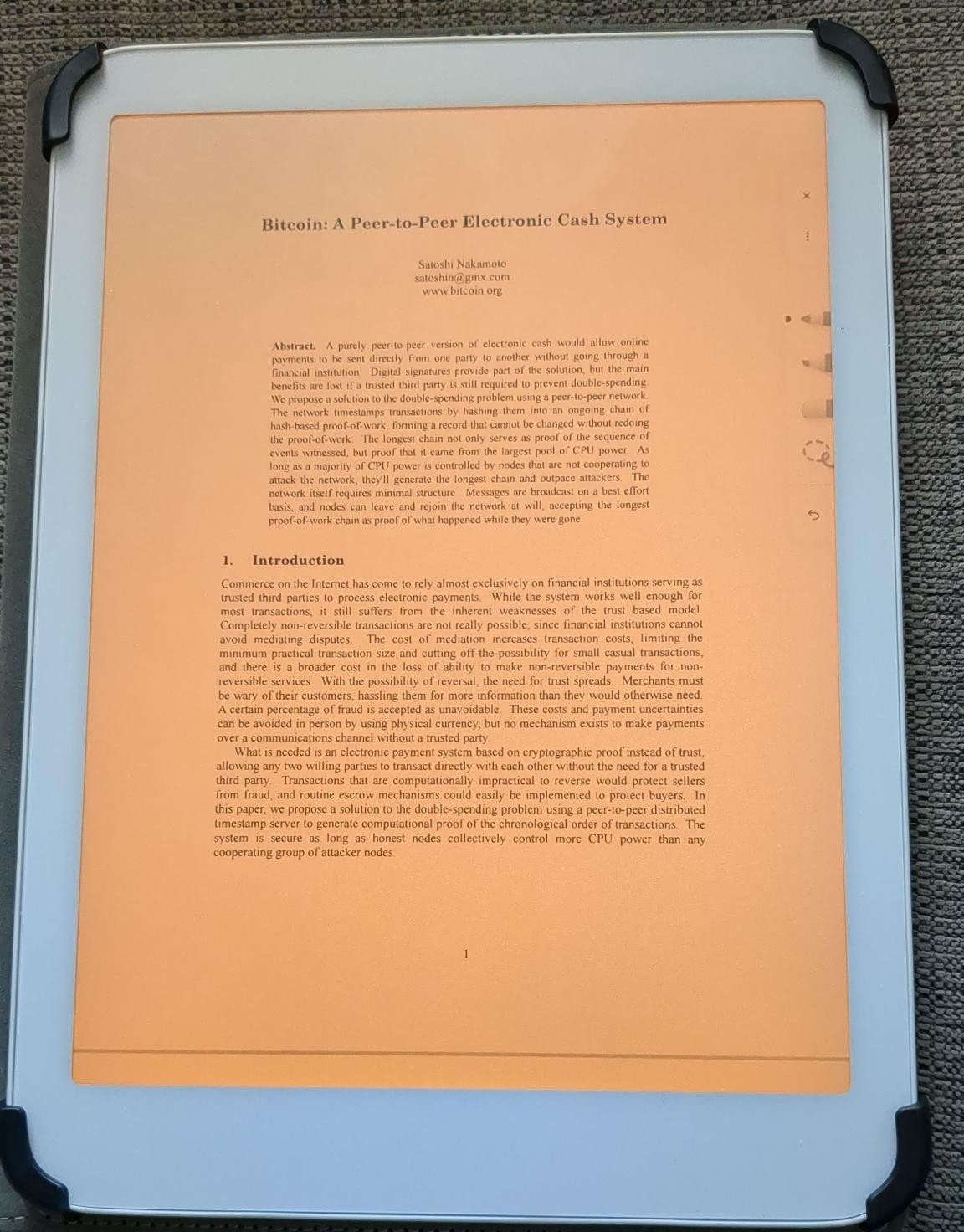
Indoor display of the Daylight DC1 computer

Daylight Computer Co. is a Public Benefit Company that designs and manufactures devices that do not emit blue light or flicker. Anjan Katta, the company's founder and CEO, stated that he started the company to reduce his personal eyestrain and the distraction that came with conventional devices.

The first device that the company released is the Daylight DC-1, a tablet using a monochrome transflective liquid-crystal display designed for outdoor use, while also being usable indoors with an amber backlight. The company's goal is to create a "healthy computer."

== History ==
In June 2018, Anjan Katta began the process of designing a device that did not emit blue light or flicker. He was inspired by the Kindle stating that he wanted to create a device that was, "an analog object that happens to have digital magical capabilities.” By 2020, he created his first scientific prototype and created the first proof-of-concept prototype in 2021. In the early research and development stages of the device, Katta had spent $300,000 of his own money. Eventually, Katta obtained a $12 million investment from current and former executives of companies such as Oculus, Pinterest, and Dropbox.

In 2024, the company held a launch party at the Conservatory of Flowers in Golden Gate Park for the Daylight DC1, the company's first device. The event had roughly 200 attendees. Later that year, Daylight sold out its first run of 5,000 devices. The Daylight DC1 is a 1.2 pound tablet that runs its own operating system, SolOS, based on Android 13. It has a refresh rate of 60 Hz, fast enough to process video.

In 2025, the product was demonstrated by Danny Jones on the Joe Rogan Experience. The company has been described by outlets such as Wired and VentureBeat as a "returning computing to hippie ideals" and being a product for "techno-hippies."

The company is headquartered in San Francisco, California.
