= Steve Silberman =

American writer and journalist (1957–2024)

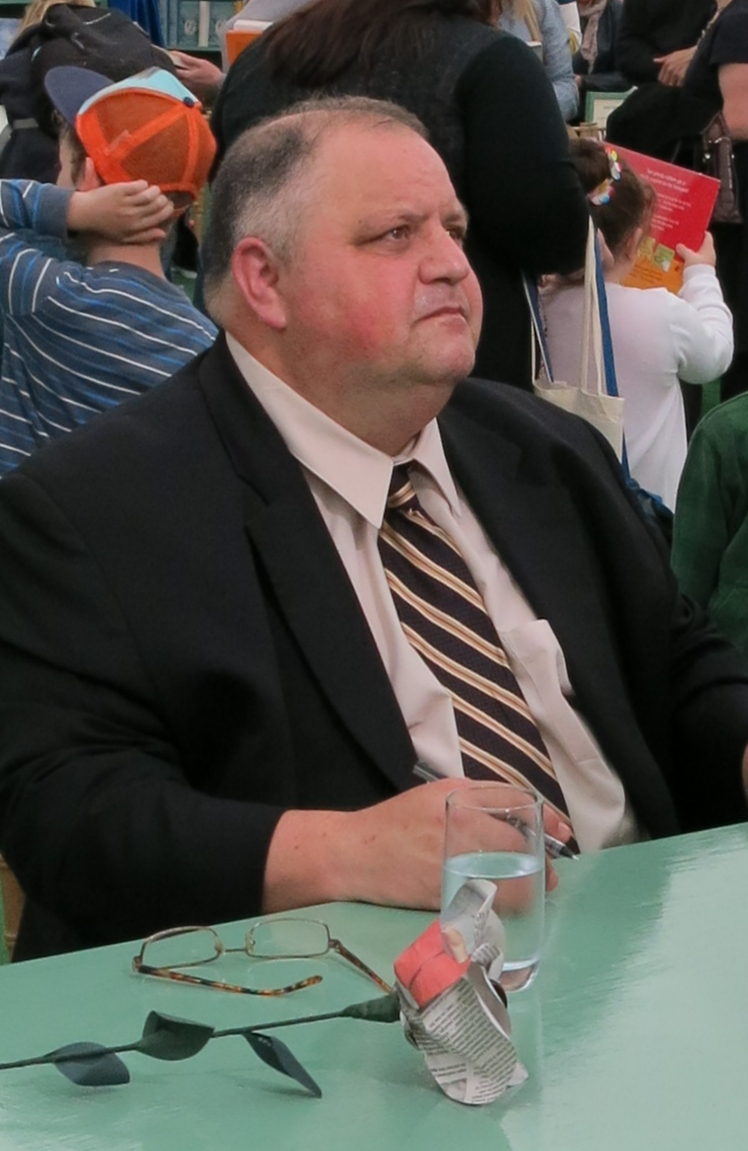
- Silberman in 2016
- Born: December 23, 1957; Ithaca, New York, U.S.
- Died: August 29, 2024 (aged 66); San Francisco, California, U.S.
- Education: Oberlin College, University of California, Berkeley
- Spouse: Keith Karraker (m. 2003)
- Writing career
- Genre: Non-fiction
- Notable work: Neurotribes
- Notable awards: Kavli Science Journalism Award for Magazine Writing; Samuel Johnson Prize
- Website: www.stevesilberman.com

Stephen Louis Silberman (December 23, 1957 – August 29, 2024) was an American writer for Wired magazine and was an editor and contributor there for more than two decades. In 2010, Silberman was awarded the AAAS "Kavli Science Journalism Award for Magazine Writing." His featured article, known as "The Placebo Problem", discussed the impact of placebos on the pharmaceutical industry.

Silberman's 2015 book Neurotribes, which discusses the autism rights and neurodiversity movements, was awarded the Samuel Johnson Prize. Additionally, Silberman's Wired article "The Geek Syndrome", which focused on autism in Silicon Valley, has been referenced by many sources and has been described as a culturally significant article for the autism community.

Silberman's Twitter account made Time magazine's list of the best Twitter feeds for the year 2011.

In 2016, he gave the keynote address at the United Nations on World Autism Awareness Day.

== Biography ==
Silberman was born on December 23, 1957 in Ithaca, New York, the son of Donald and Leslie (née Hantman) Silberman, both English professors at Jersey City State College.

He studied psychology at Oberlin College in Oberlin, Ohio, then received a master's degree in English literature from Berkeley, where his thesis advisor was Thom Gunn.

Silberman moved to San Francisco in 1979, drawn by three factors: so that he could live "a gay life without fear"; because of the music of Crosby, Stills and Nash, the Grateful Dead, and others; and so he could be near the San Francisco Zen Center. He was friends with the musician David Crosby, with whom he hosted a podcast.

Silberman studied with Allen Ginsberg at Naropa University in 1977. After Silberman interviewed Ginsberg for Whole Earth Review in 1987 the two became friends and Ginsberg invited Silberman to be his teaching assistant the next term at Naropa University. Silberman lived with his husband Keith Karraker, a high-school science teacher, to whom he had been married since 2003.

In 2019, Silberman started working on a new book, titled The Taste of Salt. According to Silberman the book was going to detail "the human stories behind one of the most impressive, but little-known, medical successes of our time: the transformation of cystic fibrosis from an inevitably fatal childhood disease to a chronic and manageable condition of adulthood."

Silberman died on August 29, 2024 at his home in San Francisco, from a suspected heart attack. He was 66.

== NeuroTribes ==
Silberman's 2015 book NeuroTribes documents the origins and history of autism from a neurodiversity viewpoint. The book has received mostly positive reviews from both scientific and popular media. In a review published in Science-Based Medicine, Harriet Hall describes NeuroTribes as "the most complete history of autism I have seen" and recommends it as "a welcome ray of clarity, sanity, and optimism". In The New York Times Book Review, Jennifer Senior wrote that the book was "beautifully told, humanizing, important"; the Boston Globe called it "as emotionally resonant as any [book] this year"; and in Science, the cognitive neuroscientist Francesca Happé wrote, "It is a beautifully written and thoughtfully crafted book, a historical tour of autism, richly populated with fascinating and engaging characters, and a rallying call to respect difference." It was named one of the best books of 2015 by The New York Times, The Economist, Financial Times, The Guardian, and many other outlets. Anil Ananthaswamy described Silberman's book in Literary Review as a "comprehensive, thoroughly researched and eminently readable" book about autism, which showcases Silberman's strengths as a journalist: "the writing is crisp, clear and engaging."

Some other reviews were less positive; for example, James Harris of Johns Hopkins University criticized NeuroTribes as a book that pushes an agenda, saying that Silberman misrepresented Leo Kanner as somebody who had a negative view towards autistics and their parents, rather than, as Harris argued, an advocate for individualized treatment for every child. An autistic autism researcher named Sam Fellowes has also attacked the book on the basis of a prochronism.

Silberman stated that a key point from the book is to recognize the need for accommodating autism as a significant disability in the same way that society accommodates wheelchair users.

=== Awards ===
- 2015 Samuel Johnson Prize
- 2015 Books for a Better Life Psychology Award, Southern New York National Multiple Sclerosis Society
- 2016 Health Book of the Year, Medical Journalists' Association
- 2016 Silver Medal, Nonfiction, California Book Awards
- 2016 Erikson Institute Prize for Excellence in Mental Health Media
- 2016 ARC Catalyst Awards Author of the Year

== Publications ==
=== Books ===
- Shenk, David; Silberman, Steve (1994). Skeleton Key: A Dictionary for Deadheads. New York: Main Street Books. ISBN 978-0-385-47402-3.
- Silberman, Steve (2015). NeuroTribes: The Legacy of Autism and the Future of Neurodiversity (1st ed.). Avery. ISBN 978-1-760-11363-6.

=== Selected articles ===
- Silberman, Steve (December 1, 2001). "The Geek Syndrome". Wired. Condé Nast.
- Silberman, Steve (August 24, 2009). "Placebos Are Getting More Effective. Drugmakers Are Desperate to Know Why". Wired. Condé Nast. "The Placebo Problem"

== Film appearances ==
- 2010 William Burroughs documentary William S. Burroughs: A Man Within
- 2017 Grateful Dead documentary Long Strange Trip
