= Transflective liquid-crystal display =

Liquid-crystal display that transmits light

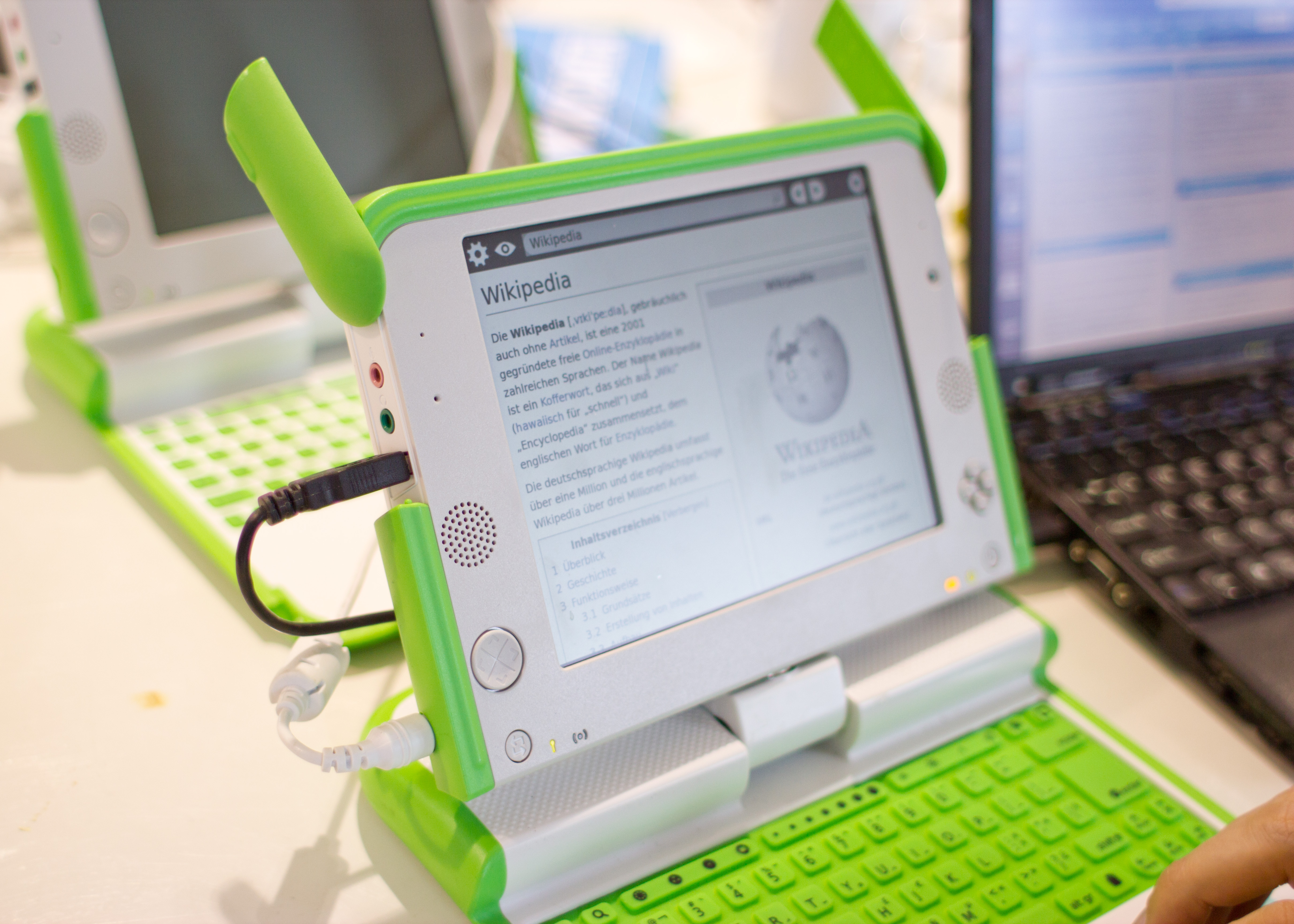
A Pixel Qi screen installed in an OLPC XO laptop operating in reflective mode. The screen is in grayscale mode and is not retro-illuminated.

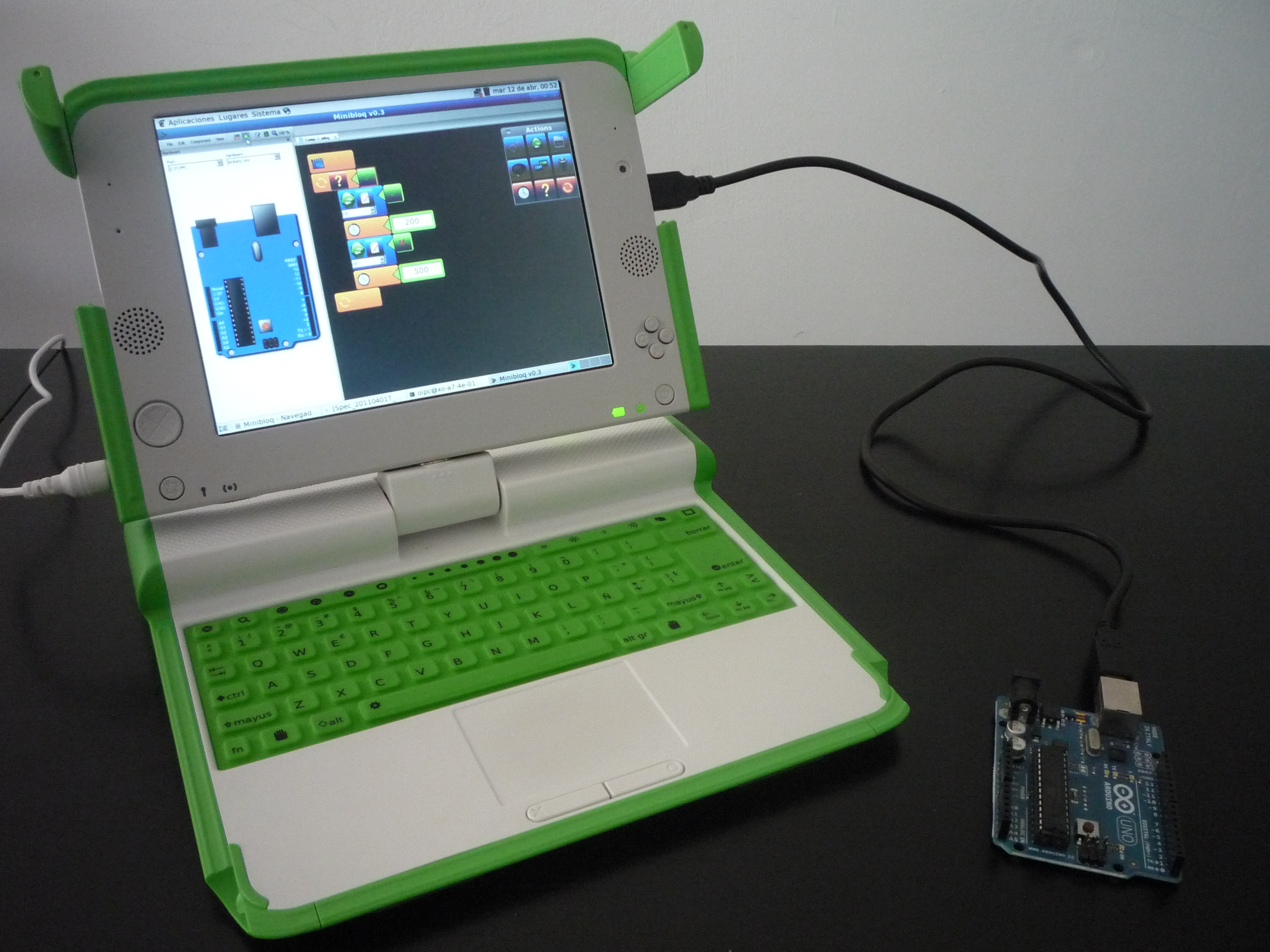
A Pixel Qi screen installed in an OLPC XO laptop operating in transmissive mode. The screen is in color mode and is retro-illuminated.

A transflective liquid-crystal display is a liquid-crystal display (LCD) with an optical layer that reflects and transmits light (transflective is a portmanteau of transmissive and reflective).

== Technology ==
Under bright illumination (e.g. when exposed to daylight) the display acts mainly as a reflective display with the contrast being constant with illuminance. However, under dim and dark ambient situations the light from a backlight is transmitted through the transflective layer to provide light for the display. The transflective layer is called a transflector. It is typically made from a sheet polymer. It is similar to a one-way mirror but is not specular.

An application is digital LCD wristwatches. In dim ambient light or at night a backlight allows reading of the display in its transmissive mode. Digital time displays in alarm clocks for bedrooms may also work this way. If they are battery-powered, the backlight may be push-button operated. The backlighting is usually dim, so that the display is comfortably readable at night. Some 21st century smartwatches such as the Pebble Smartwatch and the Amazfit Stratos also use transflective LCDs.

When an illuminance sensor is added for control of the backlight, such a transflective LCD can be read over a wide range of illuminance levels. This technique is often found in automotive instrumentation. In portable electronic devices the transflective mode of operation helps to save battery charge, since in bright environments no backlighting is required.

Some displays that transmit light and have minor reflectivity are best readable in the dark and fairly readable in bright sunlight, but only under a particular angle; they are least readable in bright daylight without direct sunlight.

== Trade names ==
Display manufacturers label their transflective screens under a variety of trade names:

- BE+: SolarbON
- Boe Hydis: Viewiz
- Daylight Computer Co.: LivePaper
- Dell: DirectVue or DirectView.
- DEMCO CSI: SOLARBON
- LG Display: Shine-Out
- Motion Computing: View Anywhere
- Motorola Mobility: AnyLight3
- NEC Displays: ST-NLT
- Nokia: BlackView (BVD)
- Panasonic: CircuLumin
- Pebble (watch): E-paper
- Pixel Qi: 3Qi

== See also ==
- Anti-reflective screen
- Electronic paper
- High brightness monitor
- Passive-matrix liquid-crystal-displays
