= Jason Johnson (entrepreneur) =

American technology entrepreneur and investor

- Education: Pepperdine University
- Occupations: CEO of August Home and chairman of the Internet of Things Consortium
- Known for: Co-founding several organizations including August Home, Rethink Books and the Internet of Things Consortium

Jason Johnson is an American technology entrepreneur who has co-founded several organizations including Doma Home, August Home, Founders Den, Rethink Books, and BlueSprig. He also co-founded and chairs the Internet of Things Consortium, a non-profit organization formed by a group of companies in the Internet of things industry. Johnson is CEO of Doma Home, a next generation smart home company he co-founded with Swiss industrial designer Yves Béhar.

== Early life and education ==
Johnson grew up in Portland, Oregon. He graduated from Pepperdine University.

== Career ==
Johnson began his career working for Merisel, a distributor of Apple products. He then worked for Tut Systems for a year before founding his first company Interquest in 1997. Before its acquisition by Darwin Networks, Johnson served as CEO of Interquest, a company which installed and operated high speed internet service in many apartment buildings in several U.S. cities including Seattle, San Francisco, Dallas, and Washington, D.C. In the late 2000s, he became vice president of marketing and business development of Via Licensing Corp., a subsidiary of Dolby Laboratories, working on IEEE standards to bring together several patents and establish standard royalty payments for licensing them.

In mid 2010, Johnson co-founded Rethink Books with Jason Illian, Rusty Rueff, and Rick Chatham. They later launched the ebook platform Bookshout in April 2012.

In January 2011, Johnson co-founded Founders Den, an incubator and coworking space for technology entrepreneurs and company founders, with Jonathan Abrams, Zack Bogue and Michael Levit. Johnson continues to serve as the managing partner of the company. Later in 2011, he cofounded BlueSprig with Hugo Dong, a software developer in China with whom he mostly communicated through Skype and email. Together they launched AirCover, a set of apps to secure mobile devices and protect them from viruses and phishing scams.

In 2012, Johnson co-founded August Home with Swiss industrial designer Yves Béhar. In January 2013, Johnson announced the formation of the Internet of Things Consortium along with several other companies including Logitech, Ouya, and SmartThings. Johnson also hinted at the formation of his own Internet of things company. August Home came out of stealth-mode in May 2013 and released a Bluetooth-enabled smart lock that allows users to control access to their homes through an app. The company later released a smart video doorbell. August Home was acquired in 2017 by the Swedish company Assa Abloy, the world's largest manufacturer of locks. Johnson continued to serve as CEO of August Home until 2021.

In 2025, Johnson co-founded a new smart home company Doma Home with his previous co-founder Yves Béhar.
