= Raw water =

Untreated water found in a natural environment

Raw water is water found in the environment that has not been treated and does not have any of its minerals, ions, particles, bacteria, or parasites removed. Without treatment, raw water can be used for irrigation, construction, or cleaning purposes. Raw water is usually not safe for humans to drink due to contamination of various kinds.

Raw water includes rainwater, ground water, water from infiltration wells, and water from bodies like lakes and rivers. Water in this form is considered raw, as opposed to water which has been treated before consumption, including drinking water, or waste water, which is contaminated due to previous use.

== Uses ==
Raw water can be used for many industrial purposes, such as cooling water, water for rinsing and chemical production. Construction industries can use raw water for making cement or for damping down unsealed roads to prevent dust rising.

In agriculture it can be used to water crops and given to livestock to drink, and it can be stored in man-made lakes or reservoirs for long periods of time.

It can also be used domestically for washing cars, as well as for raw water flushing of toilets, as a method of water conservation.

== Human consumption ==
Untreated raw water is generally unsafe for human consumption due to the presence of contaminants. A major health problem in some developing countries is use of raw water for drinking and cooking.

=== Raw water dieting ===
Around 2017, untreated spring water, described as "naturally probiotic" raw water, became a commercial product distributed through health food shops, associated with the fad diet of "raw water fasting". The diet found purchase among the "health-conscious elite" of Silicon Valley, such as the raw vegan founder of Juicero Doug Evens.

Experts have raised public health concerns about the possible occurrence of harmful bacteria, viruses, and parasites such as Giardia. The movement has also been criticised for relying on pseudoscience, and was compared by one doctor to the anti-vaccination movement. One raw water business in the United States has claimed that methods used by bottled and spring water producers could change the molecular structure of water. The fad was mocked on The Daily Show in April 2018 in a segment that included an interview with Marion Nestle.

== Composition ==
The composition of raw water is naturally variable, but commonly contains one or more of the following significant contaminants, in the form of dissolved ions, particles and living organisms:

- Humic acid and other complex acids, produced by plant decay. These occur in peat and soil and may cause discoloration and metallic taste of water.
- Minerals which make water hard. Most common are carbonates of calcium and magnesium.
- Particles of clay and silt.
- Pathogenic bacteria, viruses, protozoa and their cysts. (waterborne diseases)
- Salt, which makes water brackish, having more salinity than fresh water, but not as much as seawater.

Other, less common, contaminants of raw water include:

- Natural radioactive particles.
- Perfluorinated alkyl acids, such as perfluorooctanoic acid, which are group of pollutants that have been found in wastewater throughout Europe. There are concerns these chemicals could contaminate raw water sources that are commonly used for drinking water.
- Endocrine disruptor compounds; chemicals that can interfere with the endocrine system causing cancerous tumors, birth defects, and other developmental disorders.

These contaminants can be harmful to humans if they drink raw water containing them, or if the water is not treated properly before consumption. The contaminants can also have an effect on the local ecosystem. For example, endocrine disrupting chemicals can have harmful effects on fish populations living in natural lakes and rivers. These growing health concerns have led to the development of guidelines, such HACCP (Hazard Analysis and Critical Control Points), for the production of safe drinking water from wastewater and raw water, and research into sustainable water supply alternatives.

=== Turbidity ===
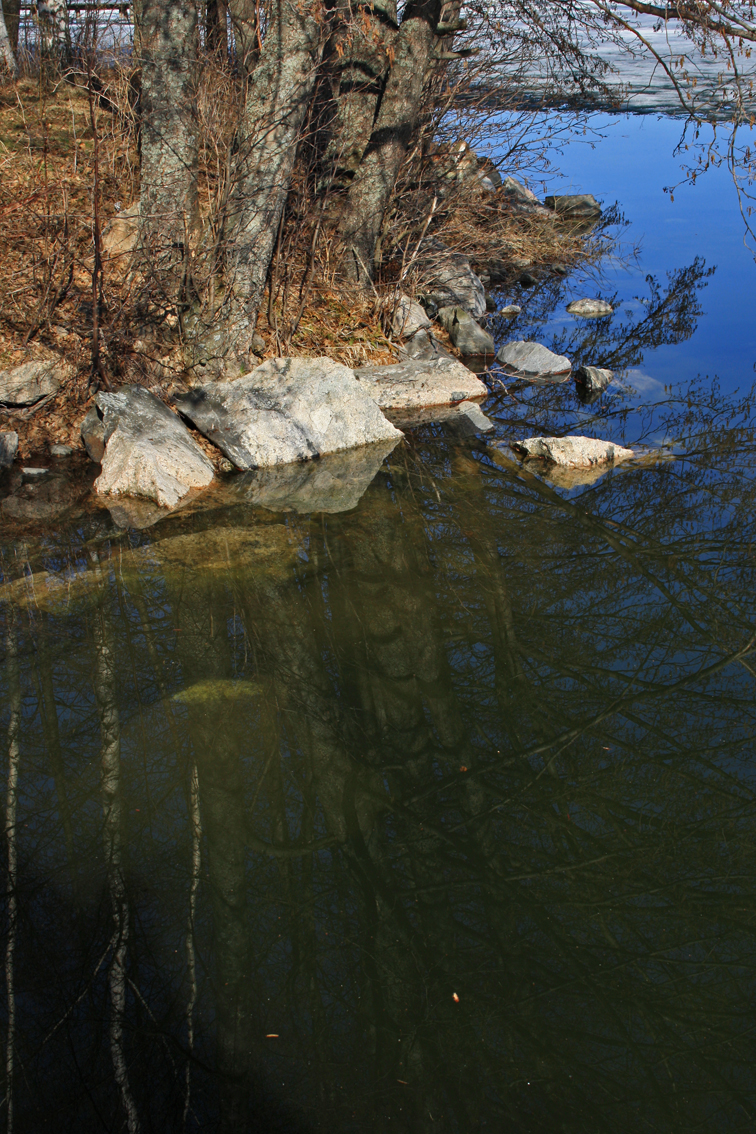
Turbid water

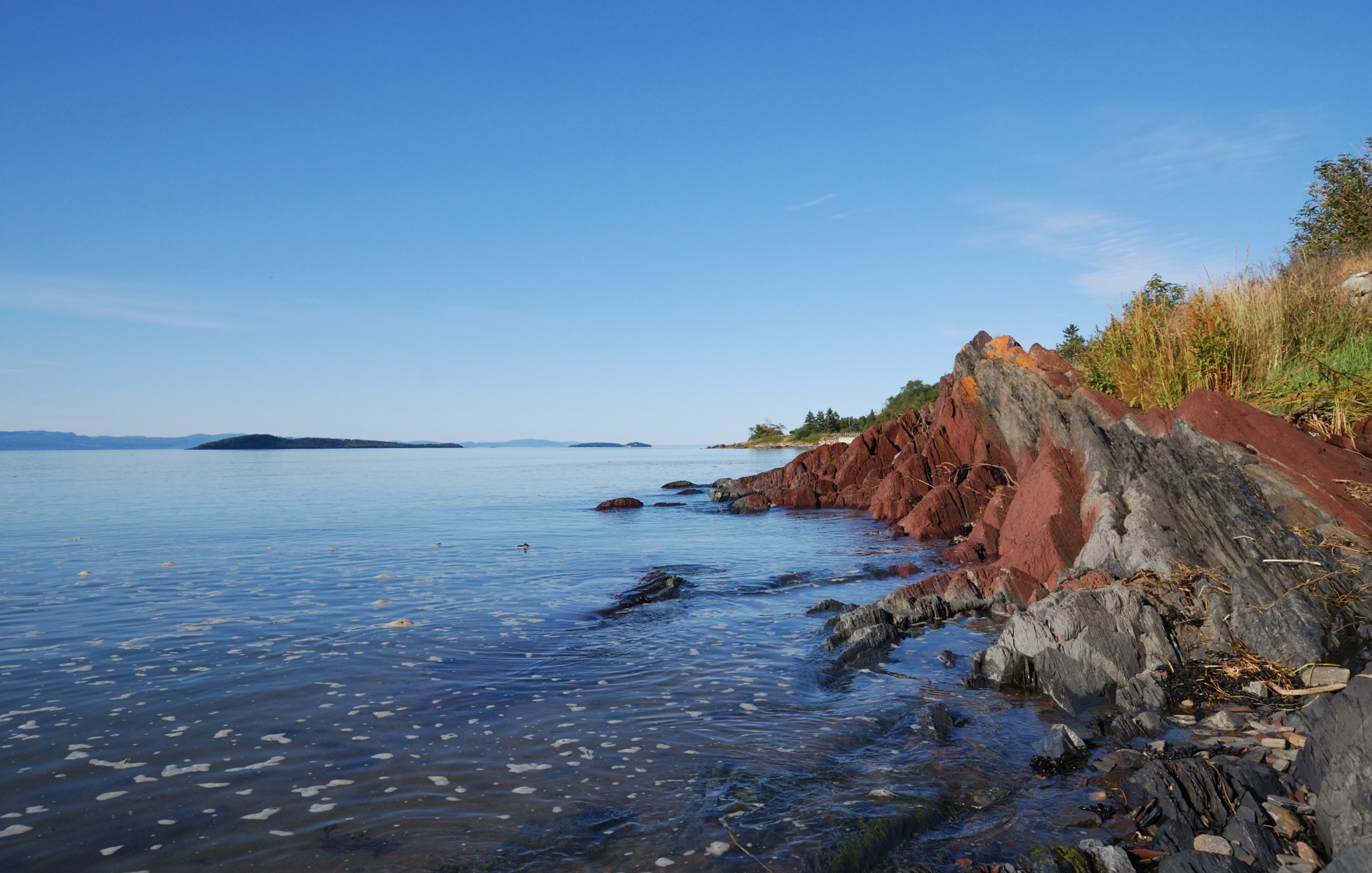
Waterside of Saint Lawrence River near Kamouraska

Turbidity is how murky or hazy water seems due to suspended particles. The more suspended particles, the higher the turbidity. Turbidity is used to visually measure water quality, being most common in unfiltered raw water. High amounts of turbidity in raw water can occur due to:

- Increased flow due to heavy rain fall
- Spring turnover of water masses
- Bank erosion
- Sediment resuspension in shallow areas
- Temporary increase from the more turbid areas

==== Turbidity and health concerns ====
During high turbidity peaks, pathogens are more commonly found in raw water. This can contribute to the spread of illnesses. When turbidity increases, reported hospital visits for the elderly (65+) with gastrointestinal illnesses also increase. Even places with water filtration systems that meet standards can have an endemic of gastrointestinal illness, or waterborne infectious diseases. Those hospitalized represent a small percentage of total morbidity caused by these illnesses.

==== Controlling turbidity ====
Controlling the land surrounding raw water reservoirs and other sources is key to reducing turbidity. Areas of high sediment resuspension and erosion need attending regularly, and screens and other devices are needed to catch suspended particles. Screens that trap particles and debris must be cleaned consistently. Flushing out water pumps should be done when demand is lowest. This gives time for the water to settle, and decrease turbidity before is it needed in high amounts. "Turbidity reduction is best achieved when the water is run through a series of chemical and physical treatment methods before reaching the filter".

== Treatment ==
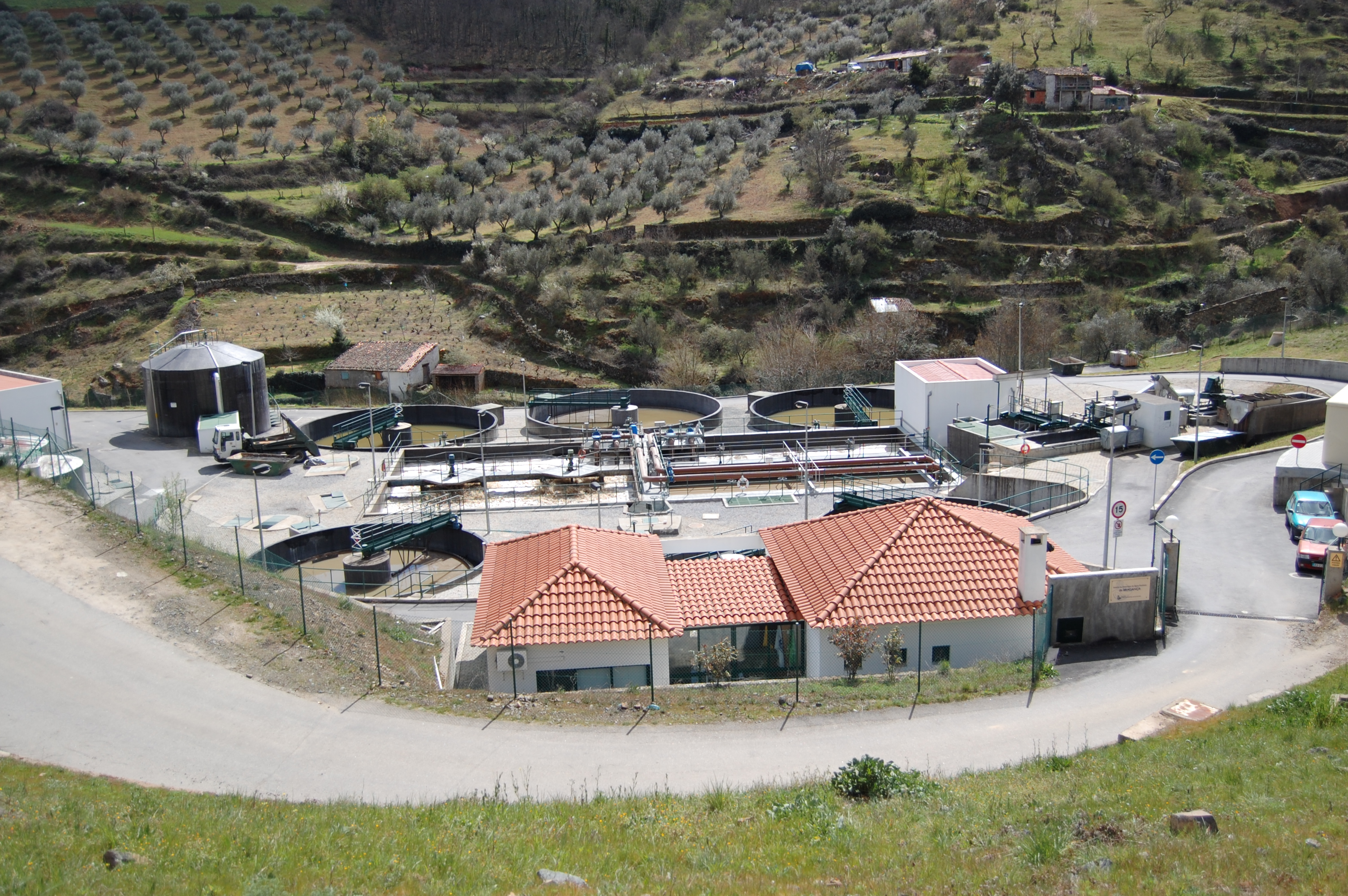
Water treatment plant at Bragança, Portugal

Due to the possible contaminants, raw water must be treated before it is allowed for human consumption or industrial use. There are several steps involved in the treatment of raw water, and different methods in which it can take place.

=== Reverse osmosis ===
Reverse osmosis has been used for the production of demineralised water for over 30 years. In reverse osmosis, water is transported across a membrane under high pressure, leaving a product that consists mainly of water and a concentrate containing most other components such as minerals and unwanted residues. Many contaminants, including iron, manganese, ammonium, traces of pesticides and medicines, organic micro pollutants, and radioactive particles can be removed with reverse osmosis alone. This efficiency has made reverse osmosis the primary method of water purification, often being used in combination with other methods, as a final treatment. A downside to reverse osmosis is that the removing of most minerals from water can have negative effects on its taste. Minerals are sometimes added to drinking water that was already filtered to improve its taste.

=== Conventional pre-treatment ===
The conventional treatment method for water purification is a complex, multistage process that was used for many years. It generally consists of five primary steps. First, raw water is adjusted for alkalinity and pH with the addition of hydrated lime and carbon dioxide. Second, particulate matter is congregated with aluminum sulphate and other coagulants, such as polymers, which the water flows in a cascade that mixes the chemicals and raw water with the coagulants. Third, the water is slowly mixed in clarifiers where larger particles settle down to the bottom and are periodically removed (sedimentation). Fourth, water is directed from the clarifiers to the filters (e.g. anthracite and sand filter) to entrap any smaller particles that survived the clarification process. Finally, sodium hydroxide is added to adjust the final pH/alkalinity, sodium hypochlorite for disinfection and fluoride for fluoridation. This process is often used as a pre-treatment method while another processes, such as reverse osmosis, is used for the final treatment. A disadvantage of this method is its use of chemicals, such as ozone, flocculents, hydrogen peroxide, lime, and chlorine for the filtration process. These chemicals could be dangerous if used incorrectly or if they remained in the water after complete treatment. This requires special precautions, and each step of the process has to be controlled to achieve an overall optimal performance. The need for a complex control system for conventional treatment can result in it being financially costly. This has led to the development of alternative pre-treatment and treatment methods for raw water.

=== Ultrafiltration ===
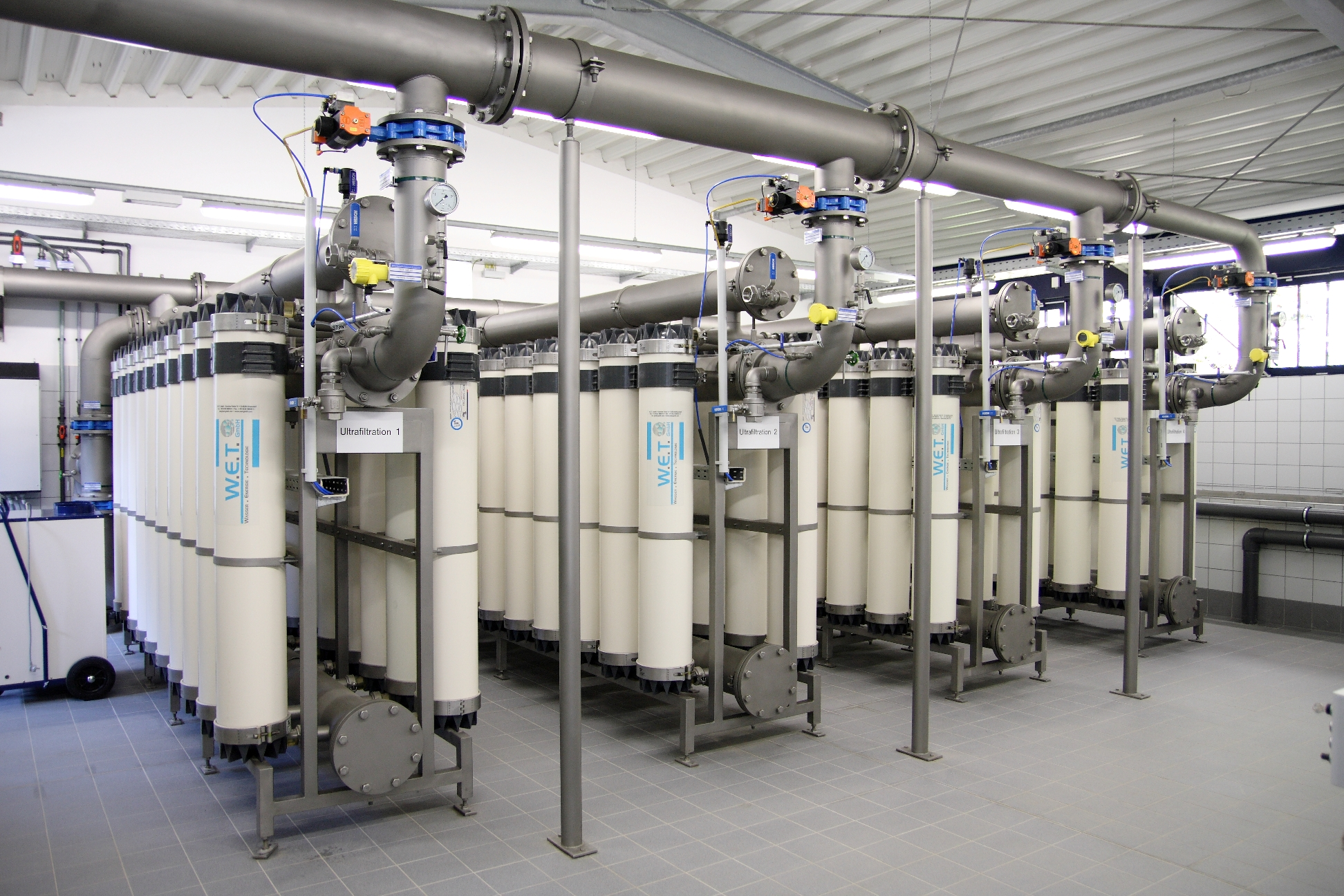
Drinking water treatment of 300 m^{3}/h using ultrafiltration in Grundmühle waterworks (Germany)

Ultrafiltration is a membrane filtration process and provides an alternative to conventional pre-treatment. In this method water is only pre-filtered with a common screen filter before being filtered at high pressure through a membrane, separating the water from contaminants within it. Ultrafiltration can be used on its own for water purification or as a pre-treatment for reverse osmosis. Its advantages over conventional pre-treatment include: very high water quality independent of the contaminants in the initial raw water, a plant that is simpler in design and more flexible, which makes it easier to automate, lower use of chemicals, and final product free of viruses and microorganisms.

=== Biofilm pre-treatment and bio-diatomite dynamic membrane reactor ===
The biofilm membrane filtration method is used to remove harmful chemical by-products, such as NH4+-N, total nitrogen, and dissolved organic matter, that could form from disinfection processes. Biofilm Pre-treatment is a necessary step for water treatment in many parts of world due to its low operation cost and effectiveness at pollutant removal. In this process microorganisms remove contaminants in raw and wastewater that are harmful to humans, but nutrients to them. Bio-diatomite dynamic membrane reactor filtration combines dynamic membrane technology for wastewater treatment, and microbial colonies that form diatomite particles to purify water. These methods are under development in China as part of addressing the country's pollution problems.

== See also ==
- Groundwater
- Wastewater
- Rainwater
- Water conservation

== Additional sources ==
- Clark, J. A.; et al. (1982). "Characterization of indicator bacteria in municipal raw water, drinking water, and new main water samples". Canadian Journal of Microbiology. 28 (9): 1002–1013. doi:10.1139/m82-150. PMID 6754044.
- LeChevallier, M W; et al. (November 1980). "Enumeration and characterization of standard plate count bacteria in chlorinated and raw water supplies". Applied and Environmental Microbiology. 40 (5): 922–930. Bibcode:1980ApEnM..40..922L. doi:10.1128/AEM.40.5.922-930.1980. PMC 291691. PMID 7447444.
