= BlueFocus Communication Group =

Chinese marketing company

- Company type: Public company
- Traded as: SZSE: 300058
- Industry: Advertising
- Founded: July 1, 1996; 29 years ago
- Headquarters: Beijing, China
- Area served: Worldwide, primarily in China
- Key people: Fei Pan (CEO)
- Divisions: BlueVision
- Website: bluefocusgroup.com

BlueFocus Communication Group (Chinese: 蓝色光标) is an ad agency engaged in marketing.

BlueFocus was founded by Oscar Zhao on July 1, 1996. It was launched on the Shenzhen Stock Exchange in 2010.

BlueFocus acquired a minority stake in Huntsworth, a London-based PR group, for £36.5 million in April 2013, and in December 2013, acquired a majority holding in social media marketing agency We Are Social for $30m.

Since 2014, BlueFocus has engaged in international expansion. It acquired a majority holding in Fuseproject, a U.S. design agency, for $46.7 million in July 2014, which 9 years later was bought back by Yves Béhar, the founder and CEO. It also acquired a majority holding in the North American assets of Canadian advertising company Vision7 International, including Cossette, an ad agency, and Citizen Relation, a PR company, in December 2014 for $210 million.

By 2014, it was listed on the Shenzhen Stock Exchange with a market capitalisation of $3.8 billion, and was ranked as the 17th largest ad agency in the world. As of 2015, its clients included PepsiCo, Lenovo, Volkswagen, and BMW.

BlueFocus established BlueVision in 2016 as the international division of the company that manages BlueFocus's overseas marketing activities.

In 2017, it attempted to merge its international efforts with US-based Fluent, but eventually discontinued the effort over political concerns. In 2019, it advanced into an arrangement whereby its international subsidiaries were partially divested into a separate company Blue Impact, which was to be purchased by a special purpose acquisition company (SPAC) Legacy Acquisition led by ex-Procter & Gamble executives Edwin Rigaud and Darryl McCall to publicly list in the United States. This arrangement was terminated in July 2020 "in response to the increasing impact on the global advertising sector, and global markets broadly, resulting from the COVID-19 pandemic, which has negatively affected the market valuations."

In 2021, BlueFocus sold a majority stake of its international division to the Québec-based global investment group Caisse de dépôt et placement du Québec (CDPQ) and global private equity firm CVC Capital Partners. Later that year the companies in its international division were grouped under the holding company brand name Plus Company.
