= Timeline of Richard Branson's business ventures =

This is a list of Richard Branson's business ventures from the 1960s to today.

== 1960s ==
- 1966 – After failed attempts to grow and sell both Christmas trees and budgerigars, Branson launches his first successful business, a magazine named Student, the first issue of which appearing in January 1968. Branson's net worth was estimated at £50,000 by 1969.

== 1970s ==
- 1970 – Start selling records by mail-order
- 1971 – Opens his first record shop on Oxford Street
- 1972 – Opens a Virgin Recording Studio
- 1973 – Launches Virgin Records record label
- 1979 – Buys the gay nightclub Heaven, located under Charing Cross railway station. It was sold in 2003 to a private buyer. Branson's net worth was estimated at £5 million by 1979.

== 1980s ==
- 1980 – Virgin Records goes international
- 1981 – Virgin buys the Kensington Roof Gardens. Kensington Roof Gardens were renamed to just The Roof Gardens. Virgin ceased its operation of The Roof Gardens in 2018.
- 1983 – Virgin Vision, later to become Virgin Communications, is formed to distribute films and videos in the television and broadcasting sector.
- 1983 – Virgin Games was launched. The company was renamed Virgin Mastertronic, then renamed Virgin Games (again) and then renamed Virgin Interactive Entertainment (also known as Virgin Interactive) and finally renamed Avalon Interactive before going out of business in 2005. A close affiliate and successor of Spanish origin, Virgin Play, was formed in 2002 from the former Virgin Interactive's Spanish division and kept operating until it folded in 2009.
- 1984 – Virgin Atlantic and Virgin Cargo are launched.
- 1984 – Virgin Vision (launched the previous year) launches "Music Box", a 24-hour satellite music station.
- 1985 – Virgin Group now includes record labels, retail outlets, exported music publishing, broadcasting, satellite television, and film and video distribution.
- 1985 – Branson starts Virgin Holidays
- 1987 – Branson takes Virgin Records to the United States
- 1987 – The Virgin Group, along with Granada, Anglia and Pearson, founds British Satellite Broadcasting and receives a UK licence to broadcast five new TV channels by satellite in the UK.
- 1987 – Virgin sets up 525, a post production facility in Los Angeles, to work on high-end commercials and pop videos.
- 1987 – Virgin sets up "Music Box" as an independent producer of music programmes.
- 1987 – Virgin buys a 45% stake in Mastertronic Group. Later Virgin Mastertronic becomes a wholly owned subsidiary of Virgin Group, creating, marketing and distributing computer games software and Sega consoles in several European countries.
- 1987 – Virgin buys Rushes Postproduction in London.
- 1987 – Virgin launches Virgin Airship & Balloon Company.
- 1987 – Richard Branson launches Mates condoms in the UK to promote condoms to young adults
- 1988 – Virgin re-opens the recently acquired and re-modelled Olympic Studios in Barnes, London.
- 1988 – Virgin launches Virgin Classics, another Virgin international record label specializing in high-quality classical music.
- 1988 – Virgin sells some of its smaller UK retail stores and puts more money into Virgin Megastores, opening new stores both in the UK and abroad.
- 1988 – Virgin sets up Virgin Broadcasting.
- 1988 – Virgin sells its shareholding in British Satellite Broadcasting.

== 1990s ==
- 1990 – Virgin arrives in Japan
- 1991 – Virgin Publishing (Virgin Books) is formed
- 1992 – Virgin Records is sold to Thorn EMI
- 1993 - Virgin Vision is bought by PolyGram for $5.6 million.
- 1993 – Virgin Radio hits the airwaves with Virgin 1215AM
- 1994 – Launch of Virgin Vodka and Virgin Cola. Virgin Vodka failed to gain traction and Virgin Cola ended production in 2014.
- 1995 – Discretely invests in AirTicketsDirect
- 1995 – Virgin Direct Personal Financial Services opens for business
- 1995 – Virgin Express: a European low cost airline is launched in Brussels after the purchase and rebranding of EBA Express. In 2005 Virgin Express merges with Sn Brussels Airlines to form Brussels Airlines. Lufthansa fully acquired Brussels Airlines in 2017.
- 1996 – V2 Music is created
- 1996 – Virgin.Net launches
- 1996 – Virgin Brides launched. Last Virgin Brides store closed in 2007.
- 1996 – Virgin Group becomes majority shareholders in London Broncos rugby league team. Virgin withdrew from the London Broncos in 2001–2002.
- 1997 – Virgin CrossCountry and Virgin Trains West Coast commence operations
- 1997 – Majority shareholding in Virgin Radio is sold to Chris Evans
- 1997 – Virgin Cosmetics launches. The company (officially The Virgin Cosmetics Company) changed its name into Virgin Vie At Home and then Vie at Home (after being bought out from Virgin Group). Vie at Home entered liquidation in 2011.
- 1998 – Virgin Clothing was launched. All activities ended by 2005.
- 1998 – 49% stake in Virgin Rail Group sold to Stagecoach Group
- 1999 – Virgin Mobile launches Virgin's first telecoms venture
- 1999 – Virgin Active launches in South Africa, UK and Italy
- 1999 – Majority shareholding in London Broncos is sold to David Hughes
- 1999 – 49% shareholding in Virgin Atlantic sold to Singapore Airlines

== 2000s ==
- 2000 – Virgin launches Australian airline Virgin Blue (now called Virgin Australia)
- 2000 – Virgin sells Rushes Postproduction to Ascent Media – then Liberty Livewire
- 2000 – Virgin launches Virgin Energy. Virgin Energy became part of EDF Energy in 2002.
- 2000 – Virgin launches Virgin Cars. Virgin Cars and its subsidiary Virgin Bikes stopped doing business in 2005.
- 2002 - Virgin Interactive Espania SA splits from Virgin Interactive and re-brands as Virgin Play. Virgin Play was liquidated in September 2009.
- 2004 – Virgin launches Virgin Galactic
- 2005 – Virgin Express merges with Sn Brussels Airlines to form Brussels Airlines. Virgin retained minority share. Lufthansa purchased 45% of Brussels Airlines in 2009, and acquired the remainder in January 2017.
- 2005 – Virgin Active UK acquires Holmes Place
- 2006 – Virgin announces Virgin Fuel, a new company to produce a clean fuel in the future
- 2006 – Virgin Active Spain is Launched
- 2007 – Virgin Active Portugal is Launched
- 2007 – Virgin launches Virgin Health Bank
- 2007 – Virgin launches Virgin Media
- 2007 – Virgin launches Virgin America
- 2007 – Virgin buys 20% stakes in AirAsia X
- 2007 – Sells Virgin Megastore in the UK and Ireland to Zavvi
- 2007 – Virgin Media Television launches Virgin 1.
- 2007 – Closes Virgin Digital in the UK (Virgin now sells music downloads through Virgin Media's website)
- 2007 – Virgin Fuel US$400 million in Virgin Atlantic jet flight on biofuels and in renewable energy.
- 2007 – Virgin Money becomes preferred bidder for acquisition of Northern Rock (and is eventually successful).
- 2007 – Virgin Radio Italia launches in Italy in joint venture with Finelco.
- 2007 – Virgin CrossCountry ceases after franchise lost to Arriva CrossCountry
- 2008 – Virgin Australia Airlines offers competitive prices between Australia and Los Angeles. Known as V Australia due to naming rights.
- 2008 – Virgin launches Virgin Healthcare
- 2009 – Virgin launches Virgin Money Giving

== 2010s ==
- 2010 – Virgin launched Virgin Racing, a Formula One team previously known as Manor Grand Prix (established by Manor Motorsport). Virgin Racing competed in 2010 season and was renamed Marussia Virgin Racing (after partnership with Marussia Motors) for 2011 season. After 2011 season, Virgin Racing became Marussia F1 Team and competed for seasons 2012, 2013, and 2014. In 2015 the team changed name into Manor Marussia F1 Team for 2015 season. Then in 2016 season the team was known as Manor Racing. The team then went bankrupt and was dissolved and did not race in the 2017 season.
- 2010 – Virgin launches Virgin Gaming, a service for people of all skill levels to play competitively on popular video games.
- 2010 – Virgin launches Virgin Produced, a film and television development, packaging and production company based in Los Angeles, California.
- 2010 – Virgin launches Project, a digital magazine created exclusively for Apple Inc's iPad.
- 2010 – Virgin Money buys Church House Trust
- 2012 – Virgin Money buys Northern Rock
- 2012 – Virgin Galactic announces the development of orbital space launch system LauncherOne.
- 2013 – Virgin Racing Formula E team is launched. First season of competition was 2014 season.
- 2013 – Virgin Media sold to Liberty Global
- 2014 – Virgin participates in Formula E for the 2014 season
- 2015 – Virgin Trains East Coast commences operating the InterCity East Coast franchise, Virgin Group hold a 10% shareholding
- 2016 – Virgin launches Virgin Voyages; Virgin Radio Jakarta launches in May 2016, replacing Ninety Niners FM. The station was owned by MPG Media
- 2017 – Virgin launches Virgin Orbit, a spin-off from Virgin Galactic. Virgin Orbit goes bankrupt in 2023.
- 2017 – Virgin invested in Hyperloop One; Branson joined its board of directors, and in December 2017 became its chairman.
- 2018 – Virgin invests in Brightline trains in Florida, USA. The system is briefly named Virgin Trains USA.
- 2018 – Virgin Trains East Coast ceases trading
- 2019 – Virgin purchases Flybe through the consortium Connect Airways, Flybe is subsequently renamed Virgin Connect.
- 2019 – Virgin Trains West Coast ceases after InterCity West Coast franchise lost to Avanti West Coast

== 2020s ==
- 2022 – Virgin Produced was shut down.
- 2024 – Hyperloop One, formerly Virgin Hyperloop, is dissolved and sells its assets.
