= Instinct (magazine) =

American monthly LGBT magazine

- First print issue cover in November 1997
- Categories: Gay men's lifestyle
- Frequency: Online magazine
- Publisher: JR Pratts
- Founded: 1997; 29 years ago
- Final issue: 2015; 11 years ago (print)
- Country: United States
- Language: English
- Website: instinctmagazine.com
- ISSN: 1096-0058

Instinct is a gay men's lifestyle and entertainment publication that operated as a print magazine from 1997 to 2015 and currently continues as an active online magazine. Founded by JR Pratts, the magazine reached an annual circulation of approximately 130,000 at its peak in 2014. During its print tenure, it won two consecutive WPA Maggie Awards for Best Alternative Lifestyle Magazine, and expanded its brand by acquiring Gay Travel News in 2006.

The magazine's content primarily focuses on gay media and culture, catering to an affluent and highly educated demographic. Critics and researchers have argued that its imagery prioritized hyper-masculine physiques, often focusing on young, white males while excluding more diverse body types. In July 2015, Instinct Publishing ceased its print operations, and the brand was acquired by Juki Media, which transitioned the publication to a fully digital format.

== History ==
Founded in 1997 by JR Pratts and Instinct Publishing, Instinct began as a print publication dedicated to gay men's lifestyle and entertainment. Based in Sherman Oaks, California, the magazine was distributed by Curtis Circulation. After launching with six issues annually in 1998 and 1999, the magazine increased its frequency to ten issues in 2000 and eleven in 2001. From 2002, the magazine transitioned to a consistent monthly schedule of twelve issues per year. In August 2006, Instinct acquired the quarterly publication Gay Travel News for an undisclosed price, relaunching it alongside the magazine's October travel issue. According to The Advocate, the acquisition placed Instinct in direct competition with LPI Media, a division of PlanetOut Inc. that published Out Traveler. By the time of the purchase, Instinct was the second best-selling gay men's lifestyle magazine, trailing only Out. Instinct won the WPA Maggie Award for Best Alternative Lifestyle Magazine in 2003 and 2004.

In 2004, Instinct's reach was formally verified by BPA Worldwide, which reported an average qualified circulation of 62,000 copies for the first half of the year. By 2007, the magazine stood out as one of the few remaining independently owned national gay magazines in the US. During this period, the publication worked with major corporate sponsors, securing high-profile advertisers such as Toyota's Scion brand, LifeStyles Condoms, and customized ad campaigns for gay audience by Diet Coke. Its digital property, staging.instinctmagazine.com, was relaunched in June 2013. Pratts remains a central figure in the brand's digital release, managing the website alongside his husband and a team of writers. By 2014, Instinct had reached a peak annual circulation of approximately 130,000. On July 31, 2015, Instinct Publishing ceased its print operations and closed the magazine's physical business. Following this transition, Juki Media became the sole owner of the Instinct brand, shifting the publication to a fully digital platform in August.

== Content ==
The magazine's coverage spans gay media, culture, political reporting, health and wellness. It was notable for being among the first gay publications to lead with a humorous editorial approach, drawing inspiration from the witty style of popular lifestyle magazines from the 1990s, such as Details, Maxim, Cosmo, and Jane. The magazine marketed itself as a "clever mix of Cosmo and Maxim for gay men". Its travel section combines practical guides with humorous essays. Writer Dustin Bradley Goltz opined that the core appeal of Instinct is its playful tone and refusal to follow the more serious style of other gay periodicals. He noted that readers enjoy the magazine specifically for its "expected bitchy irreverence."

Instinct catered to an affluent, highly educated demographic of young gay men. Its content consistently featured a majority of young, hairless, muscular white males. A 2009 study argued that the magazine's early focus on white, hyper-masculine imagery mirrored broader historical patterns in queer media. The researcher noted that the publication consistently prioritized hyper-masculine physiques, reinforcing a narrow beauty standard of slender or muscular bodies while largely excluding the overweight gay community. Echoing the same sentiment, Goltz found that the magazine often framed its audience as the "hyper-masculine queer", a role that reinforced masculine control over female sexuality. This editorial stance built a fantasy of sexual dominance over both straight men and older gay men.

== See also ==
- List of LGBTQ periodicals
- List of men's magazines
