= NYC Condom =

Device for birth control and STI prevention

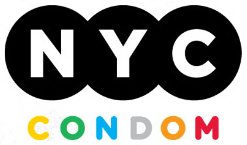
- Product type: Condoms, female condoms, personal lubricant
- Current owner: New York City Department of Health and Mental Hygiene
- Country: USA
- Introduced: February 14, 2007
- Markets: New York City
- Website: http://www.nyc.gov/condoms

The NYC Condom is a condom offered by the New York City Department of Health and Mental Hygiene's NYC Condom Availability Program (NYCAP). The program distributes free safer sex products (including male condoms, internal condoms (FC2), and lubricant).

The NYC Condom is the first municipally branded condom in the United States.

== Launch ==
The NYC Condom was launched on Valentine's Day 2007, with a citywide media campaign that included bilingual subway ads, radio spots, club launch parties, and street teams distributing the NYC Condom at high pedestrian traffic spots throughout the city. The NYC Condom Availability Program distributes free, safer sex products to both individuals and organizations across the five boroughs of New York City.

== Distribution ==
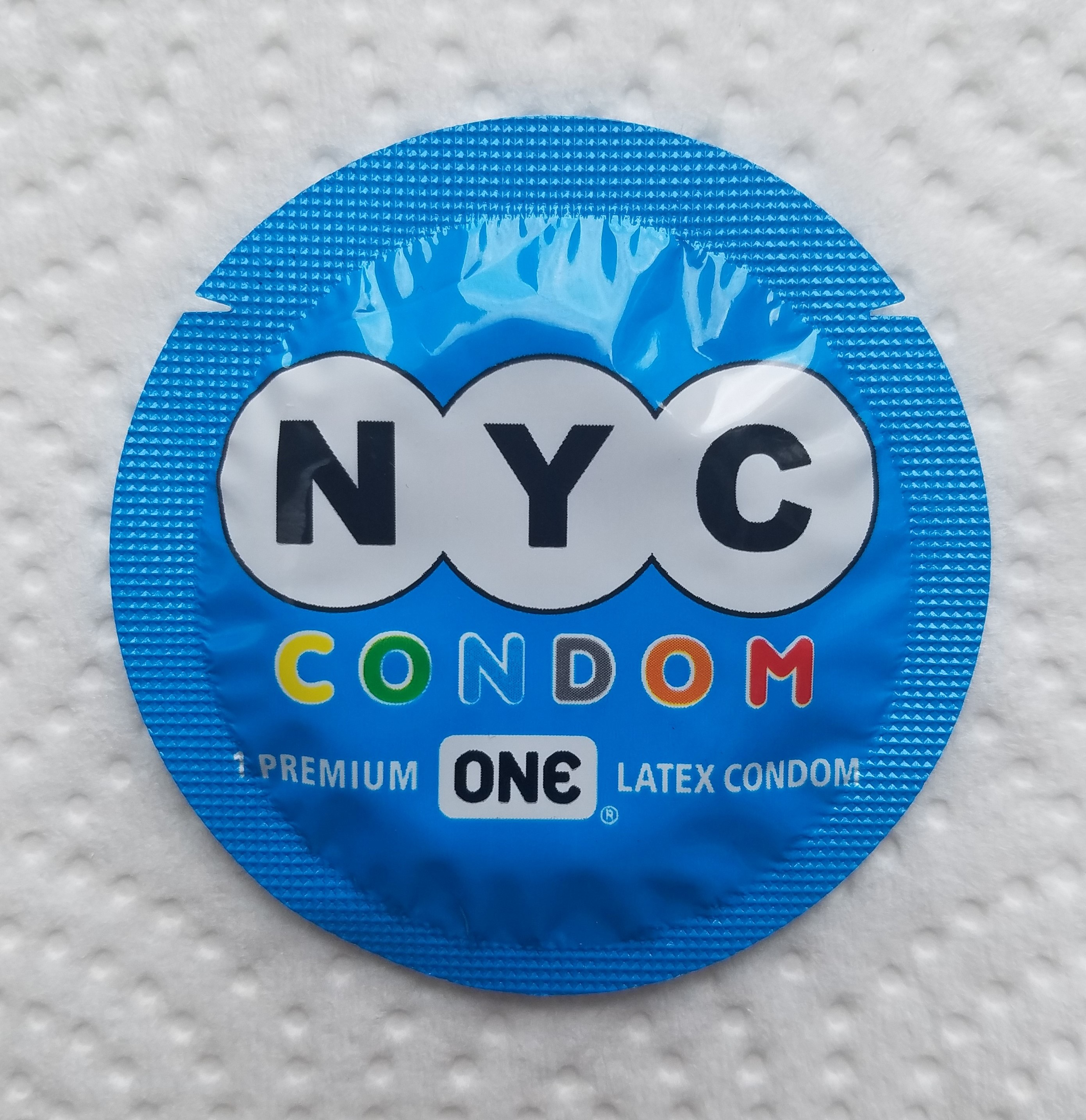
Present day NYC Condom

The NYC Condom Availability Program allows businesses or organizations operating within New York City to order free, safer sex products in bulk through the NYC Safer Sex Portal. Individuals can find and obtain free, safer sex products by searching the NYC Health Map. Distribution sites listed on the NYC Health Map have opted in as locations where any person can visit to obtain free safer sex products, no questions asked. These sites are maintained through various contracts overseen by the NYC Health Department.

NYC OpenData is a data set showcasing the current listing of locations where individuals may find and obtain free, safer sex products distributed by the City. This resource is updated daily. This resource can populate other condom finder smartphone apps or websites. NYC OpenData is a project of the New York City Department of Information Technology and Telecommunications (DoITT))

== Additional Services ==
The NYC Condom Availability Program provides free customized presentations aimed at educating New Yorkers about the correct use of free, safer sex products, condom negotiation skills, condom distribution and/or storage, etc. The program reviews and responds to concerns regarding NYC condoms and other free safer sex products distributed by the program.

== Design ==
Historic NYC Condoms

In 2008, industrial designer Yves Behar redesigned the NYC Condom logo and packaging and NYC Condom vending machines to be placed around the city.

In 2010, the New York City Department of Health and Mental Hygiene ran a contest to design a limited edition condom wrapper. The winning entry, by designer Luis Acosta, is based on a computer's power button and began distribution in Autumn 2010.

In 2014, the NYC Condom Availability Program re-launched the NYC Condom (using a blue wrapper) and introduced a NYC LifeStyle branded Large Condom called the NYC KYNG Condom.

In 2016, the NYC Condom was re-launched using the ONE Condom.

== Products Offered ==
All male condoms and lubricants provided by the NYC Condom Availability Program are rebranded ONE Condom products. Previous versions of the NYC Condom were rebranded LifeStyles Condoms.

Internal Condoms (FC2) [formerly known as the female condom] products are supplied by Veru Inc.

== History ==
Six months after the unveiling of the NYC Condom, the city's average monthly condom distribution increased from 1.5 million to more than 3 million condoms per month.

On Valentine's Day 2011, the New York City Department of Health unveiled a smartphone application directing users to the nearest source of free NYC Condoms.

A 2012 report found NYC Condoms being smuggled out of the city and illicitly sold for profit in places such as the Dominican Republic.

In 2024, the initial five-year contract between ONE® Condoms (Global Protection Corp) and the NYC Health Department reached its natural expiration. While the partnership remained active through the launch of the "NYC Legend XL" that year, the contract officially "ended" to satisfy New York City’s mandatory competitive bidding requirements. This triggered a transitional period in 2025 where the city opened the program to new bids to ensure cost-efficiency and product variety.

By April 2026, following a comprehensive review and a surge in reported STI and HIV rates in the city's 2024 data, the Health Department officially renewed and expanded its partnership with ONE®. The new agreement, which runs through January 2031, allows the company to return as the primary vendor, supplying millions of free "Super Sensitive" and specialty condoms to over 1,000 locations citywide.

== See also ==
- Life Guard DC
