= Jimmyjane =

American sex toy brand

JIMMYJANE is a luxury intimate wellness brand that was founded in San Francisco, California, and produces high-end, design-oriented lifestyle and sexual accessories, including vibrators and sex toys. Ethan Imboden, the company's founder and creative director, launched the company in 2003. In October 2014, Robert Rheaume became the president.

JIMMYJANE's product collection ranges from beauty and personal care, lotions, games, blindfolds and massage candles to award-winning vibrators, which include flagship steel, gold and platinum models. The products are designed in-house, and have been recognized with AIGA, ID and IDSA design awards.

In 2009, JIMMYJANE released the first vibrator in their Pleasure to the People series, a design collaboration between Founder, Ethan Imboden, and designer Yves Béhar. The first release in the series was the Form 2 Waterproof Rechargeable Vibrator, which was followed by Form 3, and Form 4 which completed the series after three years.

In May 2013, the vibrators were featured on the Rachael Ray show. In 2014, Imboden was a keynote speaker at the XBIZ adult entertainment industry convention in Los Angeles, in a speech about sex toys.

Over the course of 2015, Forms 1, 5 and 8 were released, as well as the LiveSexy line that are lower priced versions of the premium Form products.
