= Rushes Postproduction =

Former post-production company based in the UK

Rushes Postproduction Limited
- Type: Part of the Deluxe Entertainment Services Group
- Industry: Post-production and visual effects
- Founded: United Kingdom (1977)
- Defunct: United Kingdom (2017)
- Headquarters: Soho
- Number of employees: 90 (2007)

Rushes Postproduction was a post-production and visual effects company based in London. Rushes closed down in December 2017.

It had a worldwide reputation for producing commercial and pop-promo projects. The company was started in 1977 and its staff spawned many successful spin-offs, including The Foundry, Main Frame, Nice Biscuits and Smoke & Mirrors. Rushes was bought by Richard Branson in 1987 and sold to Liberty Livewire (rebranded Ascent Media Group) by the Virgin Group in 2000.

The company posted Dire Straits' "Money for Nothing"; the first video ever to be played on MTV Europe and the launch advert for the Ford Puma featuring a composited late Steve McQueen.

The company was the first in the UK to acquire a Rank-Cintel URSA (replaced with a Thomson Spirit) and a C-Reality Telecine as well as being the first to adopt a Discreet (now an Autodesk subsidiary) Flame SGI based compositing suite.

In 2006, Rushes became a fully HD capable facility from Telecine through visual effects and 3D. One of the first HD projects was the rebranding of ITV 3 in January 2006.

Rushes posted pop-promos for many well known bands including Arctic Monkeys, Dido, Faithless, Gorillaz, Ian Brown, Manic Street Preachers, New Order, Scissor Sisters, The Streets, Oasis, Placebo, Red Hot Chili Peppers, and Snow Patrol.

In 2009, Rushes was nominated for a Primetime Emmy Award for its visual effects work on Discovery's series, Human Body: Pushing the Limits.

The company was acquired by the Deluxe Entertainment Services Group in January 2011.

Deluxe Entertainment Services then subsequently decided to close down the 40-year-old Post House in December 2017.

== Recent film/long-form projects ==
- 2008 – RocknRolla
- 2008 – Hellboy II: The Golden Army
- 2008 – Human Body: Pushing the Limits
- 2007 – Stardust
- 2007 – 28 Weeks Later
- 2006 – Mischief Night
- 2006 – Red Road – Winner of Cannes Film Festival Prix du Jury
- 2005 – Rome
- 2004 – King Arthur
- 2004 – Around the World in 80 Days
- 1998 – Lost in Space
- 1997 – Tomorrow Never Dies

== Notable commercials/pop-promos ==
Commercials or pop-promos that Rushes worked on and were popular or groundbreaking for their time:

=== 2000s ===
- 2006 – Gorillaz "El Manana"
- 2004 – The Streets "Fit But You Know It"
- 2003 – Land Rover "Gator"
- 2002 – Smirnofff "Trainer"
- 2001 – Charmin "Bear"
- 2000 – Schweppes "Fancy Dress"
- 2000 – Kylie "Spinning Around"

=== 1990s ===
- 1999 – EastEnders opening title sequence
- 1999 – Moloko "Sing It Back"
- 1998 – Ford Cougar "Easy Driver"
- 1998 – Aphex Twin "Windowlicker"
- 1997 – Ford Puma "McQueen"

=== 1980s ===
- 1985 – Dire Straits "Money For Nothing"

== Independent articles ==
- BBC Showcase
- Classic Animation
- Fluid simulation
- Massive adoption

== Soho Shorts Film Festival ==
Each summer, Rushes hosted the Rushes Soho Shorts Film Festival.
