= Harvey Karp =

American pediatrician

Harvey Neil Karp
- Born: November 30, 1951 (74 years); New York City, NY
- Education: M.D., Albert Einstein College of Medicine, 1976; B.A., Biology Major, SUNY at Buffalo, 1972
- Known for: "The Happiest Baby on the Block", Snoo bassinet
- Scientific career
- Fields: Pediatrician, Child Development Specialist
- Workplaces: Keck School of Medicine at USC, UCLA School of Medicine

Harvey Neil Karp (born 30 November 1951, New York City) is an American pediatrician, author, and child development specialist. He is best known for his book "The Happiest Baby on the Block" and its accompanying DVD, that use his "5 S's" approach to infant care. He is also the creator of the Snoo, a smart bassinet.

He is an Assistant Professor of Pediatrics at the Keck School of Medicine at the University of Southern California and a fellow of the American Academy of Pediatrics.

== Career ==
From 1982 to 1984 Karp practiced pediatrics with pediatrician Paul Fleiss in Los Angeles, California. He then opened his own practice in Santa Monica, where he continued to see patients until 2005. He was assistant clinical professor of pediatrics at the UCLA School of Medicine from 1989 to 2009, where he served as pediatric liaison to the Child Abuse Team. He appeared as a regular contributor to the Lifetime cable television show Growing Up Together from 1990 to 1992. In 2009, he became an assistant professor of pediatrics at the USC Keck School of Medicine.

Karp is a founding board member of Healthy Child Healthy World, and has served on the advisory boards of the Green Guide, Babycenter.com, Parents, Ser Padres, and American Baby magazines.

== Infant calming and sleep technique ==
Karp's infant calming technique is supposed to be based on recreating elements of life in the womb. Human babies, according to Karp, are born less developed than other mammals. Karp calls the first three months of life the "fourth trimester." Karp hypothesizes that all babies are born with a "calming reflex" that quickly relaxes most fussy babies when they are stimulated in a way that resemble sensations that babies experience in the womb. Karp calls the ingredients of his method for soothing young babies the "5 S's": tight swaddling, side/stomach position, shushing, swinging and sucking.

Regarding sleep, Karp recommends nightly swaddling and sound and motion sleep cues to help babies establish a circadian rhythm and to promote infant sleep.

== Snoo Bassinet ==
In 2016, Karp's Happiest Baby Inc. launched an internet-connected bassinet called Snoo. The Snoo claims to automate the principles of Happiest Baby on the Block. The device uses sensors to listen for a baby’s cries and adjusts the level of white noise volume and motion of the sway accordingly. The product was designed with Swiss designer Yves Behar.

The device retails for $1,595 in the United States. About half of Snoo users opt to rent the device from Happiest Baby at a cost of around $150 a month.

== Criticism ==
=== Efficacy of the calming technique ===
Ralph Frenken has argued against Karp's recommendation of the use of tight swaddling and the concept of a "calming reflex." The criticism is that the effect of swaddling is not based on reflexes because (1) a releasing stimulus is missing, because swaddling most probably works by the decrease of proprioceptive and tactile stimulation and (2) the reflex response is missing, because any reflex always consists of a movement released by muscles. The child does not move but falls asleep by swaddling. Additionally, no known reflex alters the state of consciousness, but swaddling obviously does. Lactation and breastfeeding expert Nancy Mohrbacher collected several scientific studies which demonstrated negative aspects of swaddling on newborn infants.

In 2010, researchers studied the effects of video instruction concerning swaddling, side positioning, white noise, jiggling, and sucking on parents' ability to calm fussing babies. The results against a control group were statistically insignificant compared to traditional methods.

=== Use of celebrity endorsements ===
CBS news reports that "Critics say Karp is riding to fame on the strength of his patients' VIP parents, who include Michelle Pfeiffer, Pierce Brosnan and Madonna. Endorsements from several stars appear on his book jacket and video cover."

=== Prohibitive cost of the Snoo ===
Part of the appeal of Karp’s methods for calming babies was that it didn't require any fancy or expensive equipment beyond a blanket. A New York Times article documented how his messaging changed with the creation of the Snoo toward spending money on the device: "Now he was suggesting that, actually, the best way to improve your baby’s sleep required splurging on a sensory bed." A Washington Post article declared the device was a touchstone for privilege due to its prohibitive cost for many parents and that the product "has a way of separating even well-to-do parents into the Snoos and the Snoo-nots." Addressing the criticism of the device's cost, Karp downplayed the expense, stating that the device gives parents a “24-hour caregiver for the cost of 16 cents an hour.”

The high cost of the Snoo has also led to scams in the secondhand market where thieves rent the device on a stolen credit card and resell it to unwitting parents before the company remotely disabled the device.
