= Vessyl =

Drinking glass with embedded sensors and smartphone linking

Vessyl was a proposed intelligent drinking glass announced in June 2014 by Mark One, but which was never released. The cup was to have embedded sensors and the capability of linking to a smartphone to provide its user with nutritional and other data on the beverage in the cup. The creators designed Vessyl to help users make better decisions about their health and overall consumption. The cup was expected to recharge via inductive charging on a proprietary base station, to be included in the product packaging. Industrial designer Yves Béhar and his design firm Fuseproject were involved in its creation.

== Vessyl ==
During the unveiling of Vessyl in June 2014, live demonstrations of the sensor technology to journalists received wide praise. Wired called it “a fascinating milestone”. CNN called it “groundbreaking”. And Lauren Goode of Recode reported that she was “pretty wowed”.

Originally, the device was expected to ship in "Early 2015". However, in March 2015, Mark One announced via blog update that the shipping date would slip to "Q4 2015" once it has reached a satisfactory level of performance.

In May 2015, Mark One secured a Series A round of new investment funding to grow the business. In June 2015, shortly after securing this funding, co-founder and CEO, Justin Lee, decided to step down as CEO and hand the CEO role to one of the experienced candidates that he was recruiting. After stepping down as CEO in June 2015—Co-founder, Justin Lee, no longer held a day-to-day role at Mark One and moved on to other endeavors.

In October 2015, Mark One announced the introduction of a new product called Pryme Vessyl—a smart cup focused principally on Vessyl's automatic hydration tracking feature called Pryme. At this same announcement, Mark One announced that there would be further production delays to the original Vessyl.

Pryme Vessyl was available to the public in November 2015, launching in Apple Stores across North America.

In April 2016, Mark One announced a new timeline for Vessyl. Estimating Vessyl to be completed in “late 2017” using an updated sensor technology.

As of July 2017, direct email inquiries regarding Vessyl were returned with information from the company stating that they had "isolated the existing issues and have completed a plan to move forward with and that we are confident in."

As of December 22, 2017, the company's website was operational, though pre-order backers could no longer log into their account, and before the month ended the website ceased to function entirely.

As of 2018, Mark One, the company behind Vessyl, was no longer operating. At the time the company closed its doors, early pre-order backers of the Vessyl were left without any formal communication as to the shutdown of the company, with the company no longer responding to inquiries from pre-order backers, and with pre-order backer money lost. As of February 2, 2019, the domain was available on the domain registrar Namecheap, with the domain being purchased by a 3rd party on March 23, 2019, and by April 5, 2019, had become an idea board completely unrelated to the Mark One company.

== Pryme Vessyl ==
In October 2015, Mark One announced the introduction of a new product called Pryme Vessyl—a smart cup focused principally on Vessyl's automatic hydration tracking feature called Pryme.

At the same time as introducing Pryme Vessyl in October 2015—Mark One announced a production delay of the original Vessyl citing challenges due to sensor configuration, and to ensure the quality of the product.

=== Vessyl pre-order backer disappointment ===
In October 2015, the company announced that refunds would be issued to those who opted not to wait out production delays of Vessyl. However, many backers never received their requested refunds, and many who did receive a refund waited months at times, only receiving refunds after long and numerous emails with the company.

In addition to offering refunds, for pre-order backers who remained invested and hopeful of receiving their initial Vessyl orders, Mark One offered Pryme Vessyl to them, free-of charge.

Pryme Vessyl was released to the public in November 2015 along with the promise that early supporters who chose to not request a refund on their initial orders could take advantage of a free opt-in program to receive a Pryme Vessyl as a reward for being patient and maintaining their investment with the company.

Ultimately, many orders for the free Pryme Vessyl were never fulfilled for the opt-in program, with the company choosing instead to ship fulfillments to retail partners, rather than prioritizing their promise to their pre-order backers.

=== Reception ===
During its November 2015 launch, Pryme Vessyl was carried in Apple Stores across North America and had a launch partnership with Equinox. Amazon and BestBuy later became retailers.

The overall reception of Pryme Vessyl was mixed.

Some praised Pryme Vessyl's innovation in Health Technology. The product received the 2016 Fitness Award from Women’s Health Magazine and the 2016 Fitness Award from Men’s Fitness Magazine. Additionally, Margaret Rhodes of Wired reported, “Pryme is a powerful reminder of the trajectory our gadgets are on”, “a proof of concept that mining and processing personal data can translate to clear, actionable user experiences.”.

Others reported criticism. The Financial Times was unconvinced of the utility of hydration tracking, overall. And TechCrunch detailed technological challenges in the wireless connectivity of the product.
