= Rushes Soho Shorts Film Festival =

- Location: Soho, London, England, United Kingdom
- Founded: 1999
- Language: English
- Website: sohoshorts.wordpress.com

The Rushes Soho Shorts Film Festival, more commonly known as Rushes Soho Shorts Festival, is a yearly display of short films hosted by Rushes Postproduction. It has taken place every summer since 1999. What began as a small series of screenings at the Curzon Cinema in London's Soho area, has grown considerably since its inception.

== Celebrity connections ==
A large number of recognizable names have both acted in films at the festival, and presented the festival itself. The former include David Tennant, Dita Von Teese, and Michael Sheen. The latter include Graham Norton, Joseph Fiennes, and Basement Jaxx.

== Curating programmes ==
Outside of its summer festival, Rushes Soho Shorts curates work for other festivals and events. These programmes are often composed of work that has been submitted to previous Soho Shorts festivals.

== Reputation ==
In 2005, LoveFilm designated Soho Shorts as "one to look out for" and other publications, including The Guardian and Little White Lies have been similarly positive.
