= LifeStyles Condoms =

Australian condoms brand by Ansell

LifeStyles Healthcare
- Product type: Condom
- Current owner: Linden Capital Partners
- Country: USA
- Introduced: 1905; 121 years ago
- Website: http://www.lifestyles.com/ https://www.lifestylesglobal.com/

LifeStyles Condoms is a brand of condoms made by the former Australian company Ansell. In 2017, Ansell sold its condom business to a Chinese consortium for over US$600 million. Lifestyles HealthCare and all other Ansell affiliated condom brands: Skyn (non-latex condom brand sold globally), Blowtex (sold in Brazil), LifeStyles (sold in Australia and in United States), Manix/Mates (sold in Europe: France, UK and other countries), Unimil (sold in Poland) and Jissbon (sold in China).

In 2017, Ansell announced the sale of their sexual wellness business to Chinese companies Humanwell Healthcare and CITIC Capital; the acquisition was completed in the same year.

On November 9, 2020, Humanwell Healthcare, which held a 60% stake in the sexual division (the remaining 40% was held by CITIC Capital), announced the sale of a 40% stake for US$200 million to Chinese private equity firms Hillhouse Capital Boyu Capital and CareCapital Partners, through the subsidiaries LFSY Holdings Limited, Autumn Appaloosa Limited and CareCapital Lifestyles Holdings, Ltd. After this announcement, the new ownership structure became 40% CITIC Capital, 20% Humanwell Healthcare, 18% Hillhouse Capital, 16% Boyu Capital and 6% CareCapital Partners.

On July 23, 2021, Bloomberg News reported that the owners of Lifestyles Healthcare, led by majority shareholder CITIC Capital, were considering selling the condom and lubricant maker's operations outside of China for about US$500 million. That meant current shareholders intended to keep the condom maker's business in China after the divestment.

On September 29, 2022, the Australian newspaper Australian Financial Review reported that the owners of Lifestyles Healthcare, led by majority shareholder CITIC Capital, were in final talks with a US-based Private Equity firm for the sale of the global operation (excluding the Chinese market) for a value of more than US$500 million.

On December 1, 2022, Linden Capital Partners, a Chicago-based private equity firm focused exclusively on the healthcare industry, announced the acquisition of LifeStyles Healthcare. As part of the transaction, the Chinese operations of LifeStyles, including the Jissbon brand, would be separated from the parent company and be retained by the selling shareholders.

On December 14, 2023, LifeStyles Healthcare acquired Control Healthcare from Artsana Group. Control was created in 1977 in Spain, and it commands a strong market share in Italy, Spain and Portugal.

== Advertising and marketing ==
In 1987, in their advert a woman says: "I'll do a lot for love, but I'm not ready to die for it", to directly confront the AIDS epidemic.

In 1996, the company began advertising on television in the United States, where broadcasters had previously been unwilling to air the commercials.

== Product line ==
- LifeStyles Skyn Condoms
- LifeStyles X2 Lubricated Condoms
- LifeStyles Ultra Thin Condoms
- LifeStyles Ultra Sensitive Condoms
- LifeStyles Ultra Sensitive Lubricated Condoms
- LifeStyles Ultra Lube Plus Condoms
- LifeStyles Ultra Lubricated Condoms
- LifeStyles Pleasure Tripped Condoms
- LifeStyles Ribbed Pleasure Condoms
- LifeStyles Sheer Pleasure Condoms
- LifeStyles Warming Pleasure Condoms
- LifeStyles His n' Her Pleasure Condoms
- LifeStyles Triple Pleasure 3-in-1 Condoms
- LifeStyles MEGA Condoms
- LifeStyles Studded Condoms
- LifeStyles Flavors/Colors Condoms
- LifeStyles Snugger Fit Condoms
- LifeStyles Condom Discs
- LifeStyles Classic Collection of Condoms
- LifeStyles Condom Pleasure Pack
- LifeStyles Premier Collection Lubricated Condoms
- LifeStyles Sensual Kit
- LifeStyles Ultra Ribbed Condom N' Ring Kit
