= Bookshout =

American ebook distributor

BookShout Logo

BookShout was a software based eBook distributor that was founded in 2010. Their main offices were based in Dallas, TX, Fort Wayne, IN and New York, NY. It was the largest provider of bulk eBook distribution in the world and worked with all of the major U.S. publishing houses including HarperCollins, Macmillan, McGraw Hill, Penguin Random House, Perseus, Simon & Schuster, Wiley, Chronicle Books, Hachette Publishing Group, and Workman.

== About ==
Bookshout was founded by Jason Illian, Rick Chatham, and Joshua Stone in 2010 as a social media app.

BookShout’s initial business model was about facilitating bulk eBook distribution and providing publishers with customizable direct-to-consumer digital storefronts.

BookShout’s business services partnered with corporations like; the Hearst Corporation, Intel, Microsoft, Sony, Cheerios, T-Mobile, CareerBuilder, Cisco, The Wall Street Journal, Salesforce, Google, Deloitte and others to aide in the marketing and promotion of products and books. BookShout's services also included onboarding, education and training of employees through the use of eBooks.

The company was the creator of a proprietary reading app that gave users the ability to interact with friends directly in the app for a unique social reading experience. BookShout had a native eReader applications on Android and iOS and could be accessed directly on the web. There were more than 2 million users on the BookShout reading platform.

In 2020, BookShout shut down and its apps were removed from the app stores.
