= Fuseproject =

Industrial design and branding firm

Fuseproject is an industrial design and branding firm. Founded in 1999 by designer Yves Béhar, the company works across an array of industries including beauty and fashion, furniture, and technology, and is based in San Francisco and New York City.

== History ==
In July 2012, Fuseproject began raising funds on Kickstarter for an open-source game console called OUYA, which uses the Android 4.1 operating system, to encourage smaller developers to design games for the platform.

In 2014, BlueFocus Communication Group, the biggest agency network in China, acquired Fuseproject in hopes of entering the US market.

In 2017, Fuseproject made international news with their design project with Juicero, for the Juicero juicer. The juicer was known for its limited functionality and high price, designed with known limitations for the user - putting Fuseproject's design reputation on the line.

In April 2022, FuseProject designed a robot sidekick for the aging of Intuition Robotics ElliQ. The project was designed as a tabletop health aid to help older people cope with mental and social activity.

In September 2023, Yves Béhar bought Fuseproject back, in order to be "more of a design collaborator, joining forces with startups—sometimes as equity partners, sometimes as cofounders."

In 2025, Fuseproject designed a prototype of the Telo MT1, a compact electric pickup truck.

== Awards and recognition ==
Fuseproject work has appeared in various publications, including The New York Times, BusinessWeek, Fast Company, Adweek, I.D., and Entrepreneur magazine.

Fuseproject has received more than 50 awards, from the Industrial Designers Society of America (IDSA)/BusinessWeek Industrial Design Excellence Awards (2006), Red Dot design awards, I.D. magazine awards, and If Industrie Hannover. Fuseproject was listed 2nd best design firm by BusinessWeek in 2004. Founder and principal designer Yves Béhar was the recipient of the National Design Award for industrial design, awarded by the Cooper–Hewitt, National Design Museum.
