= Mates condoms =

British brand of condoms

- Country: United Kingdom
- Tagline: Mates, Signs of Sexy
- Website: mates.co.uk

Mates condoms are a brand of condom sold in the UK.

== History ==
The brand was launched in the UK in 1987 by Richard Branson, with its condoms intended as a low cost alternative to more expensive brands. In November 1987 the company aired the first condom advert on British television.

In 1988, a year after launch, Richard Branson sold the company and brand to Ansell for 1 million pounds. The condom division in Ansell, of which Mates was a part, was sold in 2017 to Humanwell Healthcare Group and CITIC Capital China Partners for 600 million dollars.

== Structure ==
For many years the company in the UK was operated from Staffordshire, between the A51 and the West Coast Main Line, having relocated from South Elmsall in West Yorkshire.

== See also ==
- History of condoms
