= Yves Béhar =

American designer and entrepreneur (born 1967)

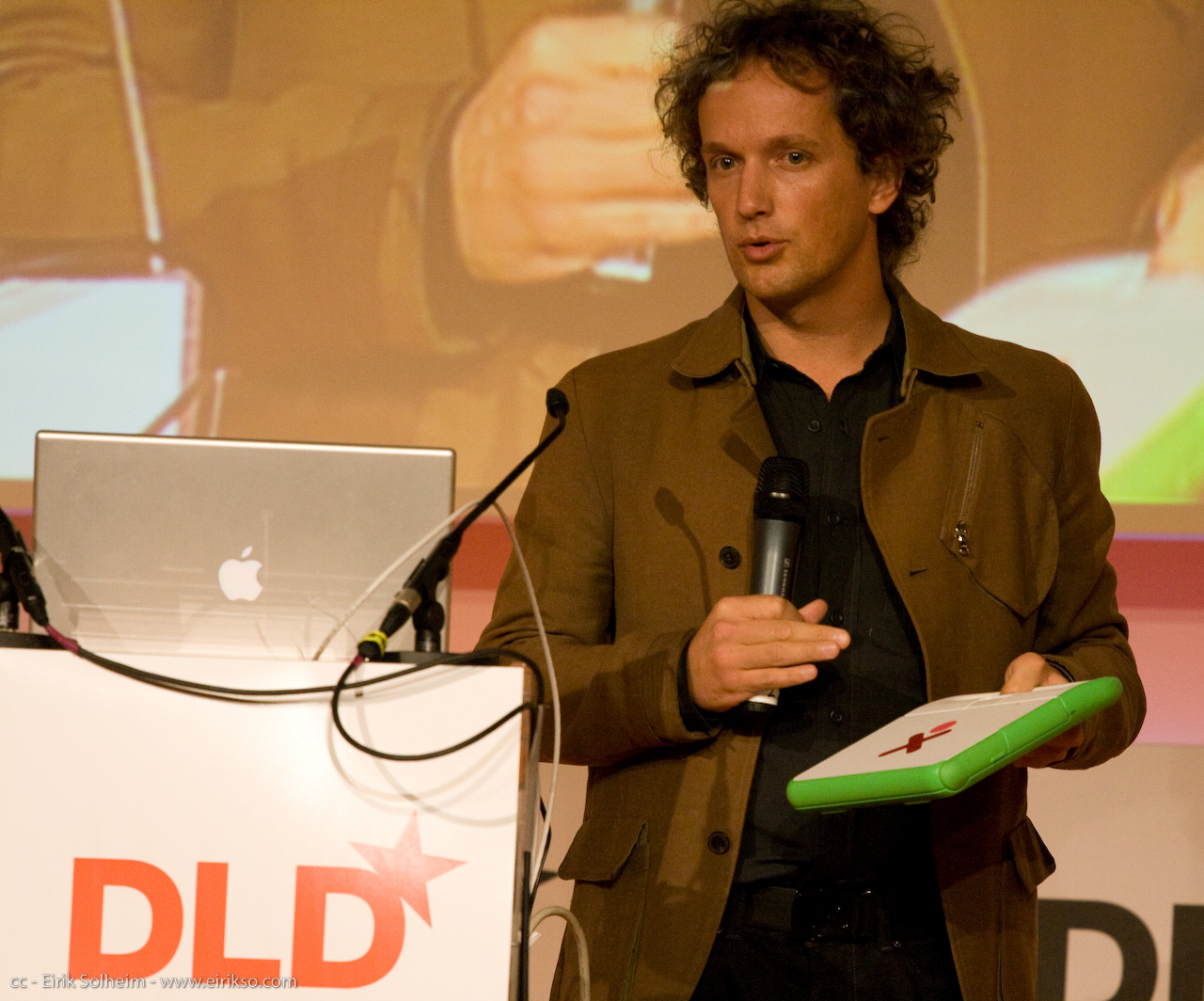
- Béhar in 2008 during the Digital Life Design conference in Munich
- Born: 9 May 1967 (age 59); Lausanne, Switzerland
- Other name: Yves Behar
- Education: B.S. Art Center College of Design
- Occupations: Industrial designer, entrepreneur, educator
- Spouse: Sabrina Buell (m. 2017)
- Children: 4

Yves Béhar (IPA: [iv be.aʁ]; born 9 May 1967) is a Swiss-born American designer and entrepreneur. He is the founder and principal designer of Fuseproject, an industrial design and brand development firm. Béhar is also the co-founder and chief creative officer of August Home, a smart lock company acquired by Assa Abloy in 2017, and co-founder of Canopy, a co-working space based in San Francisco.

His clients have included Herman Miller, Movado, PUMA, Kodak, MINI, Western Digital, See Better to Learn Better, General Electric, Swarovski, Samsung, SNOO'S Happiest Baby Smart Bassinet, Jimmyjane, Prada and Cobalt Robotics.

== Early life, education, and early career ==
Béhar was born in 1967 in Lausanne, Switzerland to a German mother, Christine Béhar, and a Sephardi Jewish father, Henry Béhar, whose ancestors were expelled from a ghetto in Venice and resettled in Turkey.

He studied drawing and industrial design in both Europe and the United States. Béhar attended school in Lausanne, Switzerland and at the Art Center College of Design in Pasadena, California. In 1991, he received a bachelor of science degree in industrial design from the Art Center College of Design.

Prior to founding Fuseproject, Béhar was design leader at the Silicon Valley offices of frog design and Lunar Design, developing product identities for clients such as Apple, Hewlett-Packard and Silicon Graphics.

From 2005–2012, he was chair of the Industrial Design Program at California College of the Arts.

== Fuseproject ==
In 1999, Béhar founded the San Francisco and New York-based industrial design and brand management firm Fuseproject. At Fuseproject, Béhar oversees product design for a variety of industrial sectors, including fashion, lifestyle, sports and technology. His clients include Herman Miller, PUMA, One Laptop per Child, Jawbone, Kodak, Mission Motors, See Better to Learn Better, General Electric, Swarovski, Samsung, Jimmyjane, and Prada. In 2010, Fuseproject was the top winner of the Industrial Designers Society of America IDSA IDEA/Fast Company awards with 14 winning products.

== Design ventures and work ==
Béhar is a sustainability advocate who argues that a designer's role is to create products that are both commercially viable and contribute to social good.

Béhar is a member of the Founder's Circle of the Cradle to Cradle Products Innovation Institute, a non-profit organization founded in 2010 in order to educate and empower manufacturers of consumer products to focus on environmental impact and social fairness.

=== Jawbone (2003–2017) ===
Béhar was the Chief Creative Officer of the wearable technology company, Jawbone, from 2003 until 2017. In 2010, Béhar redesigned the Jawbone branding, packaging, communications and products. Behar designed the JAMBOX and BIG JAMBOX, a family of bluetooth compact audio speakers and also the UP: Jawbone's app-powered health and wellness wristband. Béhar collaborated with Ceft and Company New York for the Jawbone headset visuals. As of 2017, Jawbone was being liquidated and the money was being used for a new health start-up called Jawbone Health.

=== One Laptop per Child (2005) ===
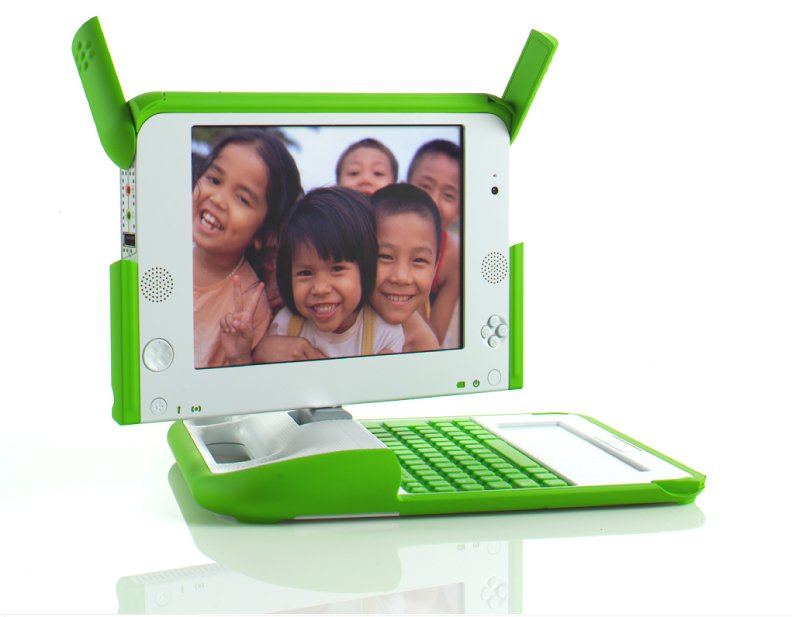
One Laptop per Child (The OLPC) XO laptop

He is the chief industrial designer of One Laptop per Child (OLPC's) XO laptop, signing on with the project in 2005. This collaboration has led to two additional laptop prototypes, the OLPC XOXO and OLPC XO-3. Béhar designed a series of low-cost, low-power laptops for distribution to low-income schoolchildren. The impact of OLPC on developing countries was so great that Uruguay purchased approximately 1,000,000 OLPC devices, and Rwanda has included an image of the OLPC XO notebook on their new currency.

=== Jimmyjane (2009) ===
In 2009, he collaborated with Ethan Imboden of Jimmyjane on a line of waterproof rechargeable vibrators. He partnered with Peel, a company that created an app and hardware to turn mobile devices into universal television remotes. Other investment and partner companies include Mint Cleaner, and Herman Miller.

=== Ver Bien para Aprender Mejor (2010–2011) ===
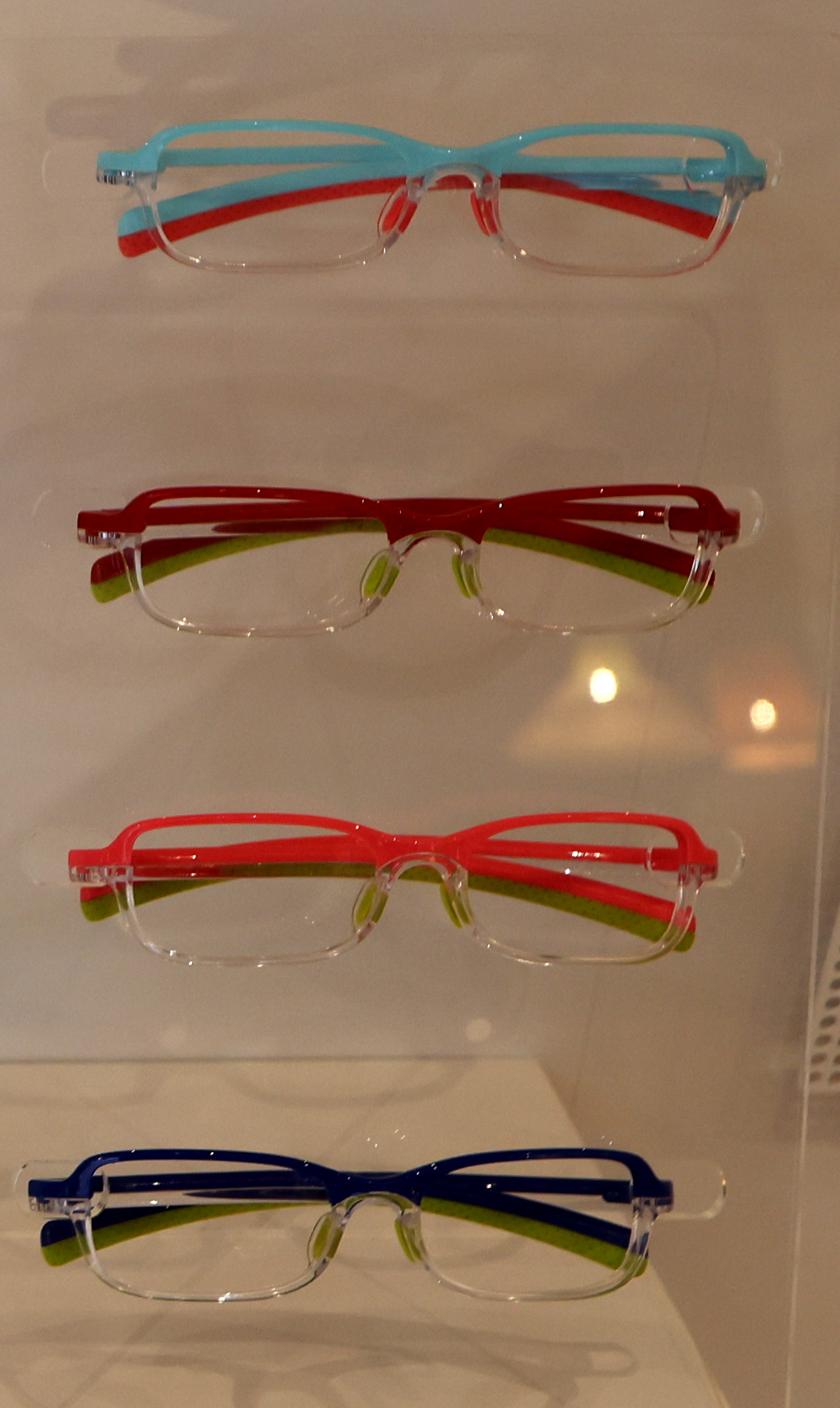
Ver Bien para Aprender Mejor eyeglasses

Béhar designed eyeglasses for the "Ver Bien para Aprender Mejor" (in English "See Better to Learn Better") program. "Ver Bien para Aprender Mejor" has provided free pairs of custom-designed eyeglasses to students throughout Mexico since 2010. In May 2011, Béhar partnered with Tipping Point, a San Francisco-based philanthropic organization, who made a pledge to the "See Well to Learn" program, which aims to distribute free pairs of glasses to San Francisco Bay Area students.

=== SPRING Accelerator (2015) ===
Béhar is also the principal designer of the SPRING Accelerator programme created by the Nike Foundation, Girl Effect, USAID and DFID. The programme takes 18 entrepreneurs annually whose businesses provide products or services that directly impact the lives of adolescent girls living in poverty worldwide. The first cohort launched in June 2015, with entrepreneurs from Kenya, Uganda, and Rwanda. Yves Béhar and fuseproject provide hands-on design support for the businesses, including brand identity, product design, interactive design, and service/business modeling – working directly with adolescent girls in order to maximize impact and scalability.

=== Other design work ===
In 2008, Béhar redesigned the NYC Condom logo and packaging, as well as NYC Condom vending machines for the New York City Department of Health as a part of an initiative to reduce HIV/AIDS and teen pregnancy.

In June 2012, Béhar and Ouya partnered to create an open, hackable game platform. The initiative launched on Kickstarter and raised over $8.5 million with over 63,000 backers. In 2012, SodaStream International teamed with Béhar to introduce Source, a new home soda machine designed with a special emphasis on sustainability.

In October 2015, Béhar and Movado announced a design collaboration, beginning with the Movado Edge; this is the first design partnership for the brand since the launch of their original Museum Dial watch in 1947.

Béhar launched the world's first smart bassinet with Harvey Karp in October 2016, the Snoo Bassinet, utilizing robotic technology to simulate the 5 S technique detailed in Happiest Baby on the Block.

In 2017, Behar introduced The Frame, a collaboration with Samsung; The Frame is a smart TV that, instead of going black when turned off, displays a piece of artwork from a world-renowned artist. The Frame has an extended art collection with works from the Van Gogh Museum, Andy Warhol Museum, and the Prado. In 2017, Béhar designed a model of security robots for use in workspaces which was launched by Cobalt Robotics.

== Personal life ==
Béhar has four children; Sky (born 2007) from a prior relationship and Sylver (born 2010), Soleyl (born 2014), and Saylor (born 2016) with Sabrina Buell. His children all have the letter Y in their name to honor his father, Henry. Béhar married Sabrina Buell in September 2017 at Burning Man, at the wooden Aluna structure designed by Colombian architect Juan David Marulanda.

== Unsuccessful products ==
In June 2014, Béhar partnered with Mark One to announce Vessyl, a proposed intelligent drinking glass designed to help users make better decisions about their health and overall consumption. After taking in more than US$11m in funding ($7m in institutional funding, and $4m in preorders), the product never shipped.

In 2017, Béhar made international news with his work with Fusebox on the Juicero juicer. It was known for limited functionality and high price, designed with known limitations for the user putting Fuseproject's design reputation on the line. Shortly after the criticism, the company closed.

== Awards and honors ==
Additionally, Béhar is the only designer to have received two Index: Awards, with an additional nomination for his design of Puma's "Clever Little Bag."

- 2017 – Swiss Institute Honoree, Swiss Institute
- 2015 – Design Visionary Award, Design Miami
- 2014 – Béhar's company fuseproject listed among World's Top 10 Most Innovative Companies in Design by Fast Company,
- 2012 – Béhar was featured on a February 26, 2012 episode of CNN's The Next List.
- 2011 – INDEX award for the OLPC XO laptop and the Verbien See Better to Learn Better, a collaboration with Augen Optics, eyeglass program
- 2011 – Conde Nast Innovation and Design Awards, 2011: Yves Béhar – Designer of the Year, PUMA Clever Little Bag – Sustainability.
- 2011 – Treehugger's Best of Green Architecture and Design Awards – Herman Miller SAYL and GE WattStation
- 2010 – IDEA Awards 2010: ranked #1 winner with 14 awards in Fast Company
- 2008 – Design Museum London "Design of the Year" award for One Laptop per Child (Brit Insurance 2008 Design Award)
- 2007 – Béhar listed among TIME's "Top 25 Visionaries"
- 2007 – Fast Company 2007 Master of Design
- 2004 – National Design Award, category of Product Design from the Cooper-Hewitt, National Design Museum

== Exhibitions and museum collections ==
=== Solo exhibitions ===
- 2004 – The San Francisco Museum of Modern Art,
- 2004 – The Museum of Contemporary Design and Applied Arts (MUDAC) in Lausanne, Switzerland,

=== Group exhibitions ===
- 2012 – Béhar's work, Alef of Life was a touring exhibition at the Contemporary Jewish Museum in San Francisco, as part of the exhibit "Do Not Destroy: Trees, Art, and Jewish Thought: An Exhibition and The Dorothy Saxe Invitational".

Béhar has work in the permanent collection at the Museum of Modern Art (MoMA) in New York City, and SFMoMA. Béhar is on the board of trustees for SFMoMA.
